= List of mammals of Madagascar =

This is a list of the native wild mammal species recorded in Madagascar. As of June 2014 (following the IUCN reassessment of the lemurs) there are 241 extant mammal species recognized in Madagascar, of which 22 are critically endangered, 62 are endangered, 32 are vulnerable, 9 are near threatened, 72 are of least concern and 44 are either data deficient or not evaluated. All of the critically endangered species are lemurs. (Note: This list is derived from the IUCN Red List, which includes extant mammal species as well as four recently extinct species known from subfossil remains. To these have been added other species believed to have died out following the arrival of humans, as well as a few species known from Holocene remains whose extinction dates are poorly constrained. The taxonomy and naming of the individual species is based on those used in existing Wikipedia articles, supplemented by the common names and taxonomy from the IUCN, Smithsonian Institution, or University of Michigan where no Wikipedia article was available.)

The mammalian fauna of Madagascar is highly distinctive and largely endemic. The extant nonmarine, nonchiropteran taxa constitute (as of June 2014) 168 species, 40 genera and 9 families; of these, besides a probably introduced shrew, (Note: The Madagascan pygmy shrew is also present on the Comoros where it is thought to have been introduced. It may also be present on Socotra. Some authorities view it as conspecific with the widespread Etruscan shrew.) endemic taxa make up all the species, (Note: The tailless tenrec and the common brown and mongoose lemurs are also present on the Comoros; all are thought to have been introduced there.) all the genera, and all but one of the families. (Note: The rodent family Nesomyidae is also present in Africa. Madagascar has nearly as many nesomyid species as Africa.) This endemic terrestrial fauna, consisting of lemurs, tenrecs, nesomyine rodents and euplerid carnivorans, is thought to have colonized the island from Africa via four (or five, if aye-ayes arrived separately) rafting events. The other historic terrestrial or semiterrestrial mammal group, the extinct hippopotamuses, is thought to have colonized the island possibly several times, perhaps via swimming.

Earlier in the Holocene, Madagascar had a number of megafaunal mammals: giant lemurs such as Archaeoindris which at over 200 kg was comparable in mass to the largest gorillas, as well as the hippopotamuses. The island also hosted flightless elephant birds weighing up to 700 kg, the largest known birds of all time. (Note: It was long suspected that, like the native mammals, ratites reached Madagascar from Africa (possibly before the splitting of the two land masses), so that the closest relatives of elephant birds would have been ostriches. A stunning finding from ancient DNA analysis, however, is that the closest extant relatives of elephant birds are actually the diminutive kiwi of New Zealand.) All of these went extinct following the first appearance of humans about 2000 years ago. (Note: This depletion of the megafauna is consistent with what has happened everywhere else in the world first colonized by humans in the last 100,000 years.) Today, the largest surviving native mammals of the island, such as the indri and fossa, have weights only approaching 10 kg. Most if not all of the 29 listed extinct species are believed to have died out in prehistoric times; none of these are known to have survived into the post-European contact period.

The following tags are used to highlight each species' conservation status as assessed by the International Union for Conservation of Nature; those on the left are used here, those in the second column in some other articles:

EX	Extinct	No reasonable doubt that the last individual has died.
EW	Extinct in the wild	Known only to survive in captivity or as a naturalized population well outside its historic range.
CR	Critically endangered	The species is in imminent danger of extinction in the wild.
EN	Endangered	The species is facing a very high risk of extinction in the wild.
VU	Vulnerable	The species is facing a high risk of extinction in the wild.
NT	Near threatened	The species does not qualify as being at high risk of extinction but is likely to do so in the future.
LC	Least concern	The species is not currently at risk of extinction in the wild.
DD	Data deficient	There is inadequate information to assess the risk of extinction for this species.
NE	Not evaluated	The conservation status of the species has not been studied.

== Order: Afrosoricida (tenrecs, otter shrews and golden moles) ==
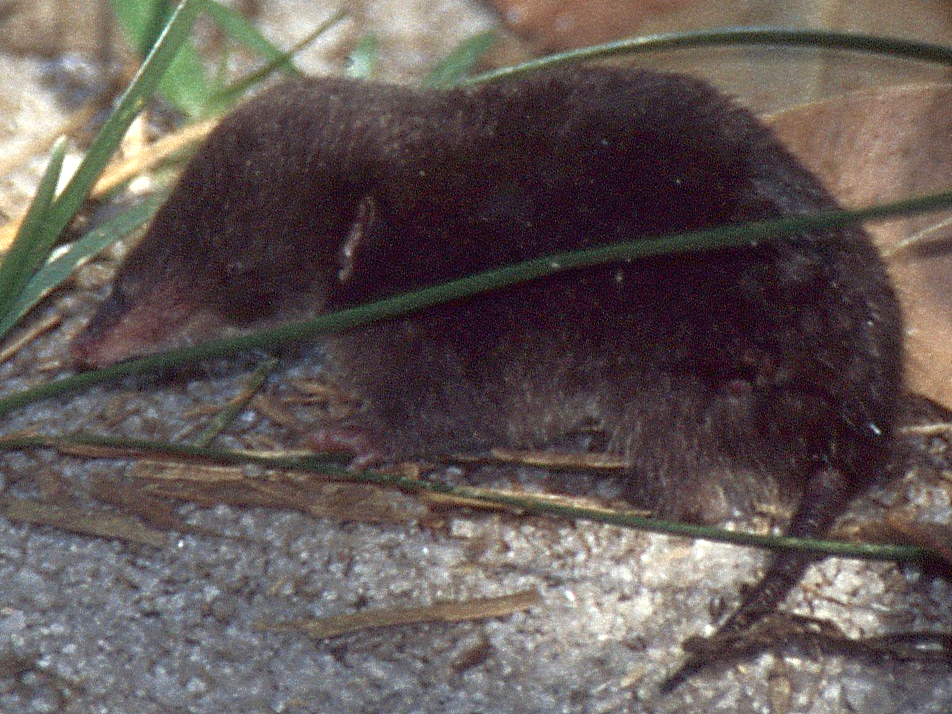
Mole-like rice tenrec

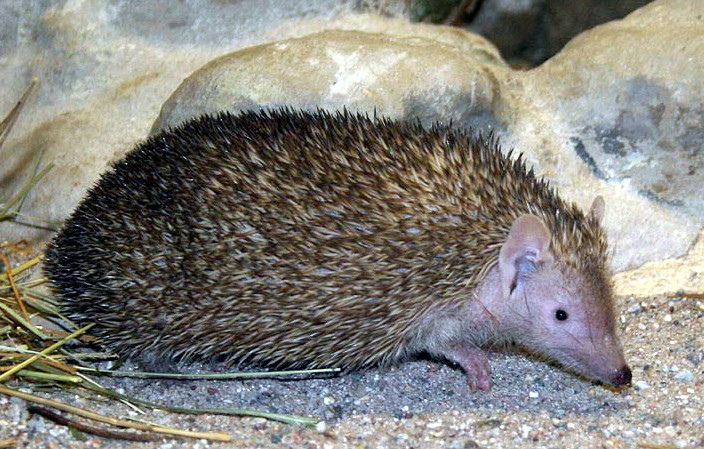
Lesser hedgehog tenrec

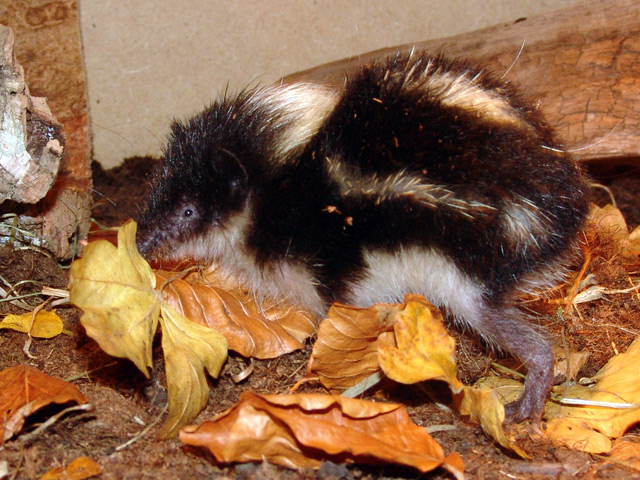
Highland streaked tenrec

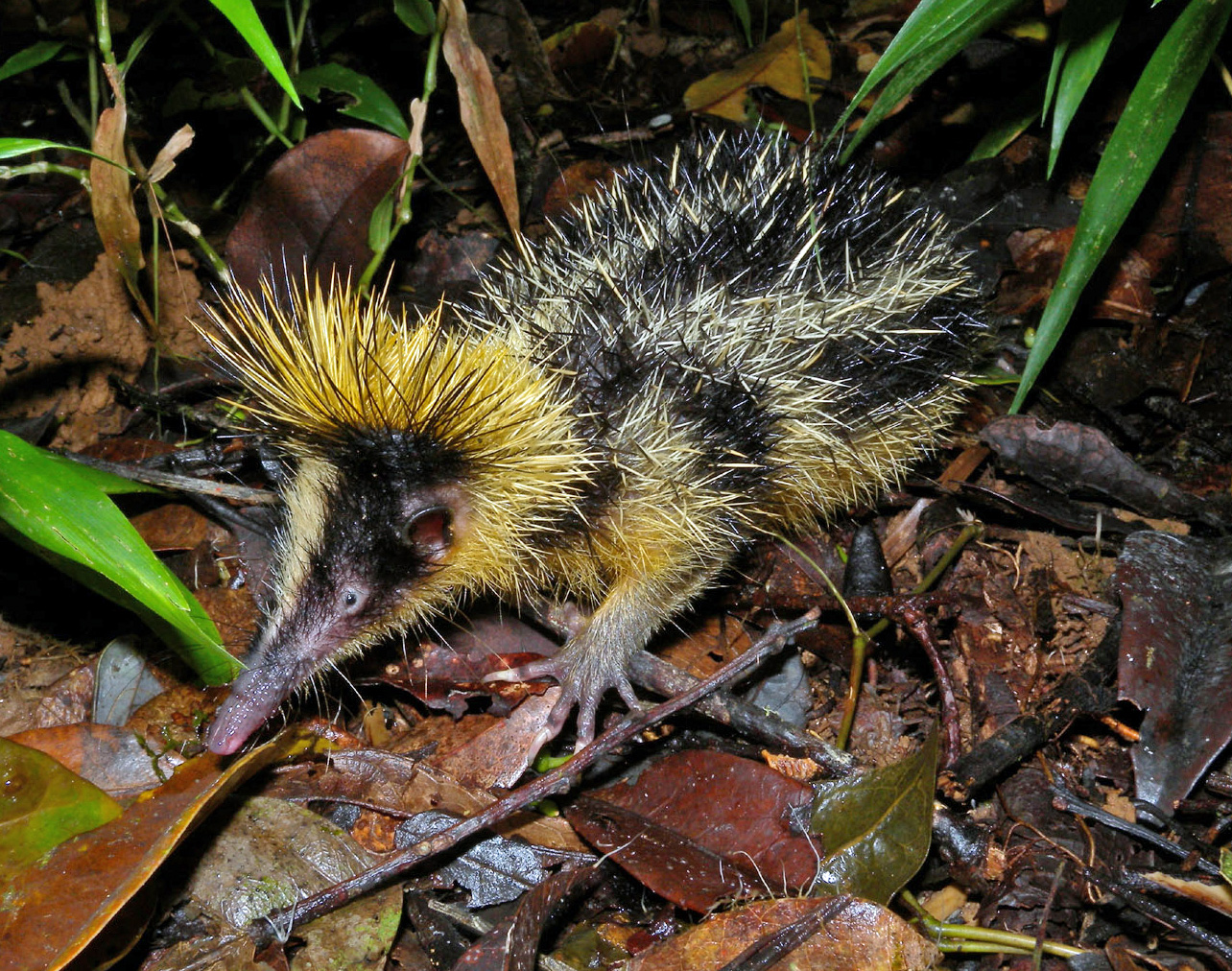
Lowland streaked tenrec

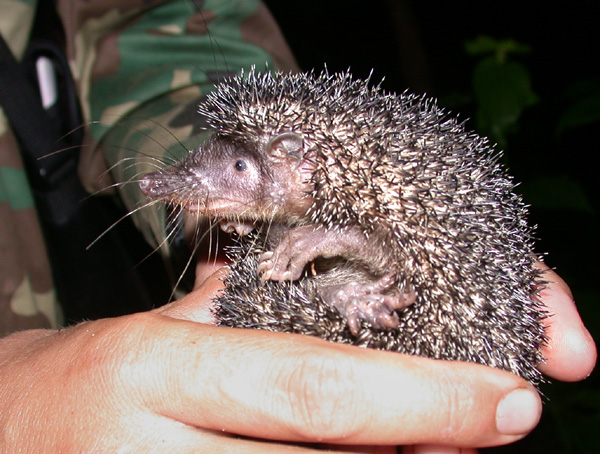
Greater hedgehog tenrec

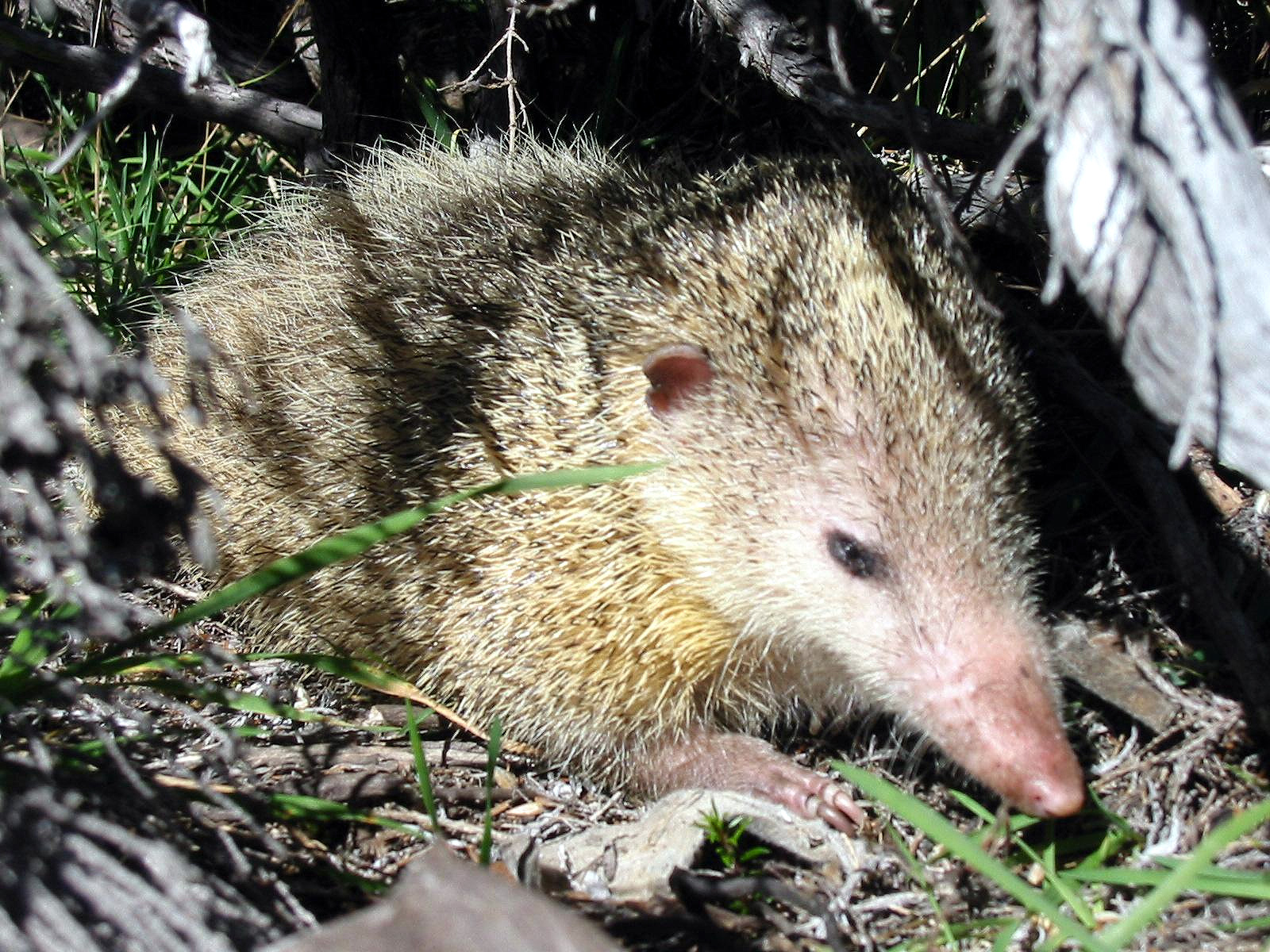
Tailless tenrec

The afrotherian order Afrosoricida contains the golden moles and otter shrews of sub-Saharan Africa and the tenrecs of Madagascar, families of small mammals that were traditionally part of the order Insectivora. All native tenrecs of Madagascar are believed to descend from a common ancestor that lived 29–37 million years (Ma) ago after rafting from Africa, with the split from their closest relatives, the otter shrews of equatorial Africa, dated to about 47–53 Ma ago.

Afrosoricida also contains the enigmatic extinct genus Plesiorycteropus, represented by two extinct species of dog-sized, probably insectivorous mammals restricted to Madagascar. Morphological analyses have tended to place them within Afrotheria close to aardvarks (order Tubulidentata), perhaps due to convergent specializations for digging. Analysis of preserved collagen sequences, however, places them in Afrosoricida closest to (and possibly within) tenrecs. The two species differ in size and aspects of morphology. They survived until as recently as 2150 BP.

- Family: Tenrecidae (tenrecs)
  - Subfamily: Geogalinae
    - Genus: Geogale
      - Large-eared tenrec, G. aurita LC
  - Subfamily: Oryzorictinae
    - Genus: Microgale
      - Short-tailed shrew tenrec, Microgale brevicaudata LC
      - Cowan's shrew tenrec, Microgale cowani LC
      - Drouhard's shrew tenrec, Microgale drouhardi LC
      - Dryad shrew tenrec, Microgale dryas VU
      - Pale shrew tenrec, Microgale fotsifotsy LC
      - Gracile shrew tenrec, Microgale gracilis LC
      - Grandidier's shrew tenrec, Microgale grandidieri LC
      - Naked-nosed shrew tenrec, Microgale gymnorhyncha LC
      - Jenkins's shrew tenrec, Microgale jenkinsae EN
      - Northern shrew tenrec, Microgale jobihely EN
      - Lesser long-tailed shrew tenrec, Microgale longicaudata LC
      - Major's long-tailed tenrec, (Microgale majori) LC
      - Web-footed tenrec, Microgale mergulus VU
      - Montane shrew tenrec, Microgale monticola VU
      - Nasolo's shrew tenrec, Microgale nasoloi VU
      - Pygmy shrew tenrec, Microgale parvula LC
      - Greater long-tailed shrew tenrec, Microgale principula LC
      - Least shrew tenrec, Microgale pusilla LC
      - Shrew-toothed shrew tenrec, Microgale soricoides LC
      - Taiva shrew tenrec, Microgale taiva LC
      - Thomas's shrew tenrec, Microgale thomasi LC
    - Genus: Nesogale
      - Dobson's shrew tenrec, Nesogale dobsoni LC
      - Talazac's shrew tenrec, Nesogale talazaci LC
    - Genus: Oryzorictes
      - Mole-like rice tenrec, Oryzorictes hova LC
      - Four-toed rice tenrec, Oryzorictes teradactylus DD
  - Subfamily: Tenrecinae
    - Genus: Echinops
      - Lesser hedgehog tenrec, Echinops telfairi LC
    - Genus: Hemicentetes
      - Highland streaked tenrec, Hemicentetes nigriceps LC
      - Lowland streaked tenrec, Hemicentetes semispinosus LC
    - Genus: Setifer
      - Greater hedgehog tenrec, Setifer setosus LC
    - Genus: Tenrec
      - Tailless tenrec, Tenrec ecaudatus LC

== Order: Sirenia (manatees and dugongs) ==
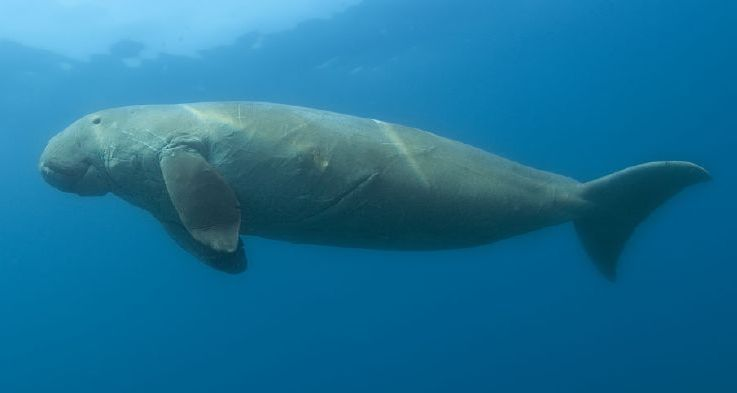
Dugong

Sirenia is an order of fully aquatic, herbivorous mammals that inhabit rivers, estuaries, coastal marine waters, swamps, and marine wetlands. All four species are endangered. The dugong ranges widely along coastlines from east Africa to Australasia. It and the tenrecs are Madagascar's only extant afrotherians.

- Family: Dugongidae
  - Genus: Dugong
    - Dugong, D. dugon VU

== Order: Primates ==
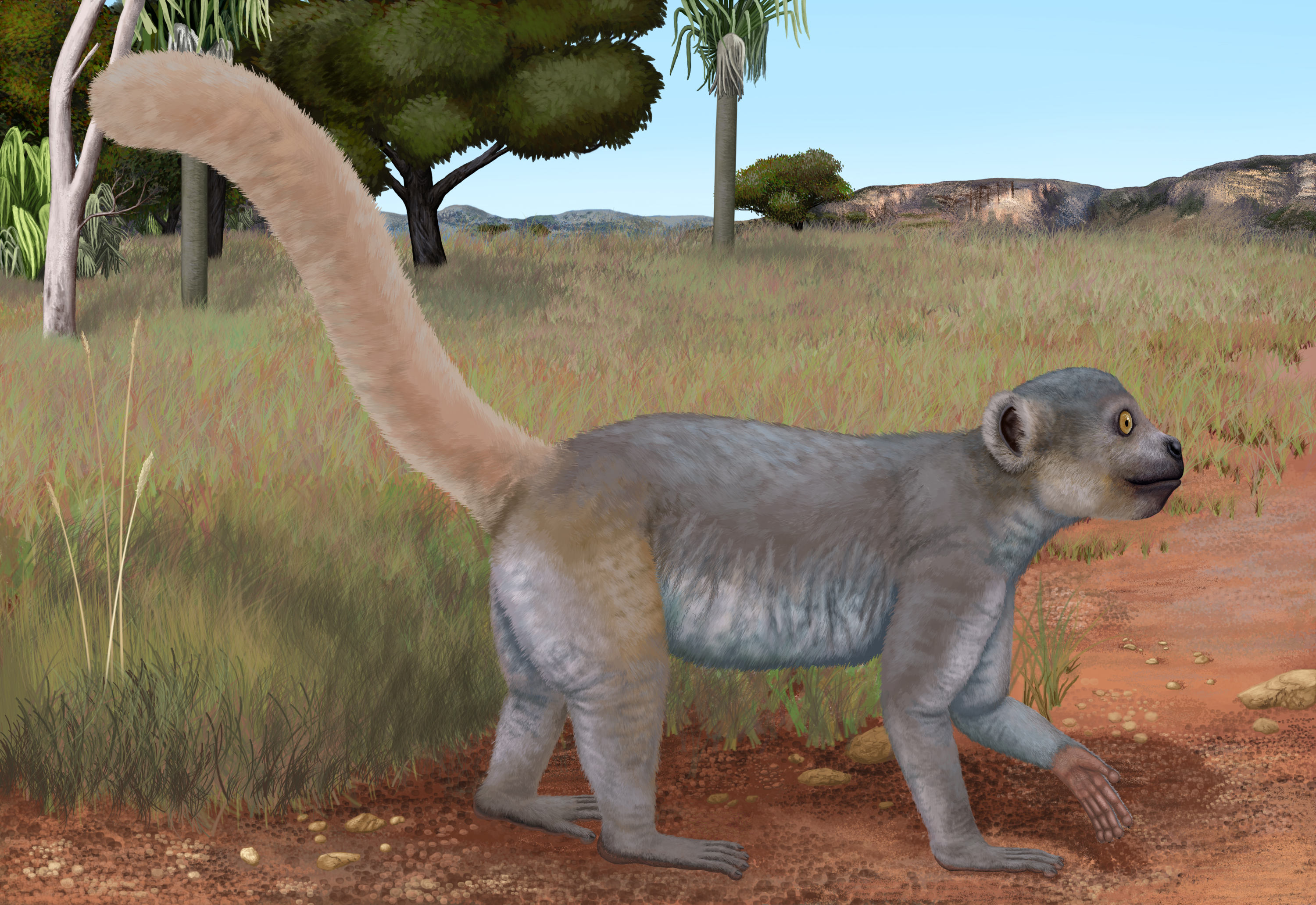
†Archaeolemur edwardsi

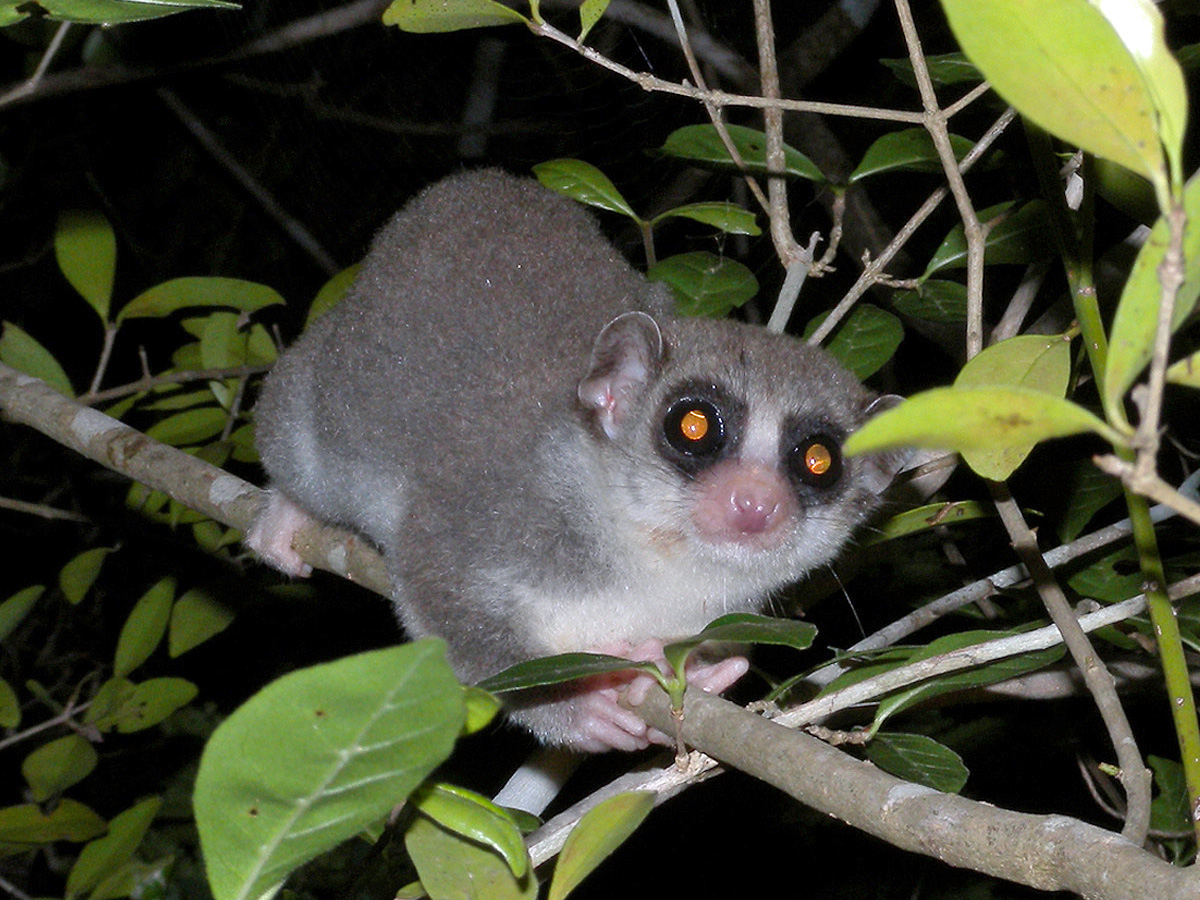
Fat-tailed dwarf lemur

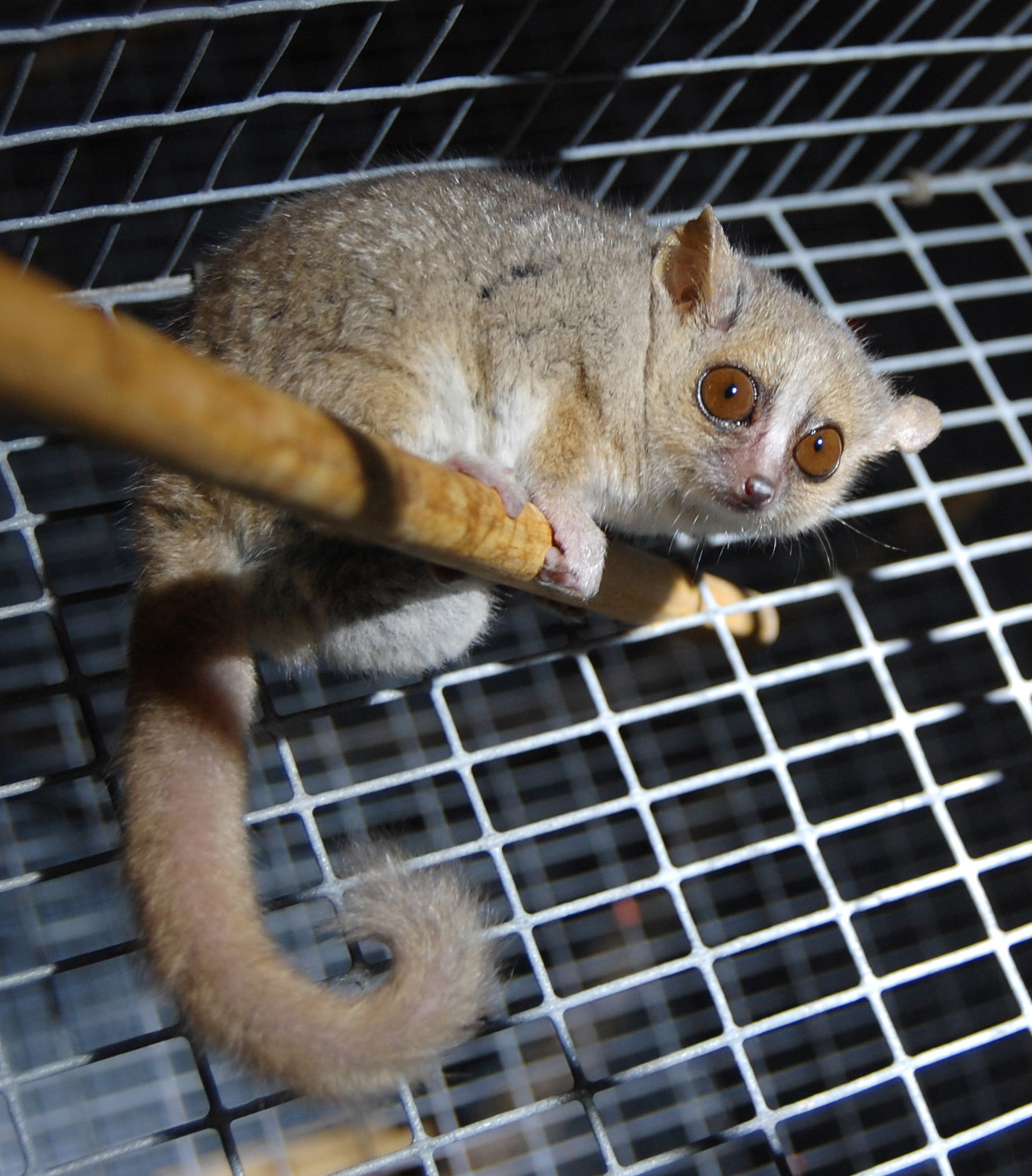
Gray mouse lemur

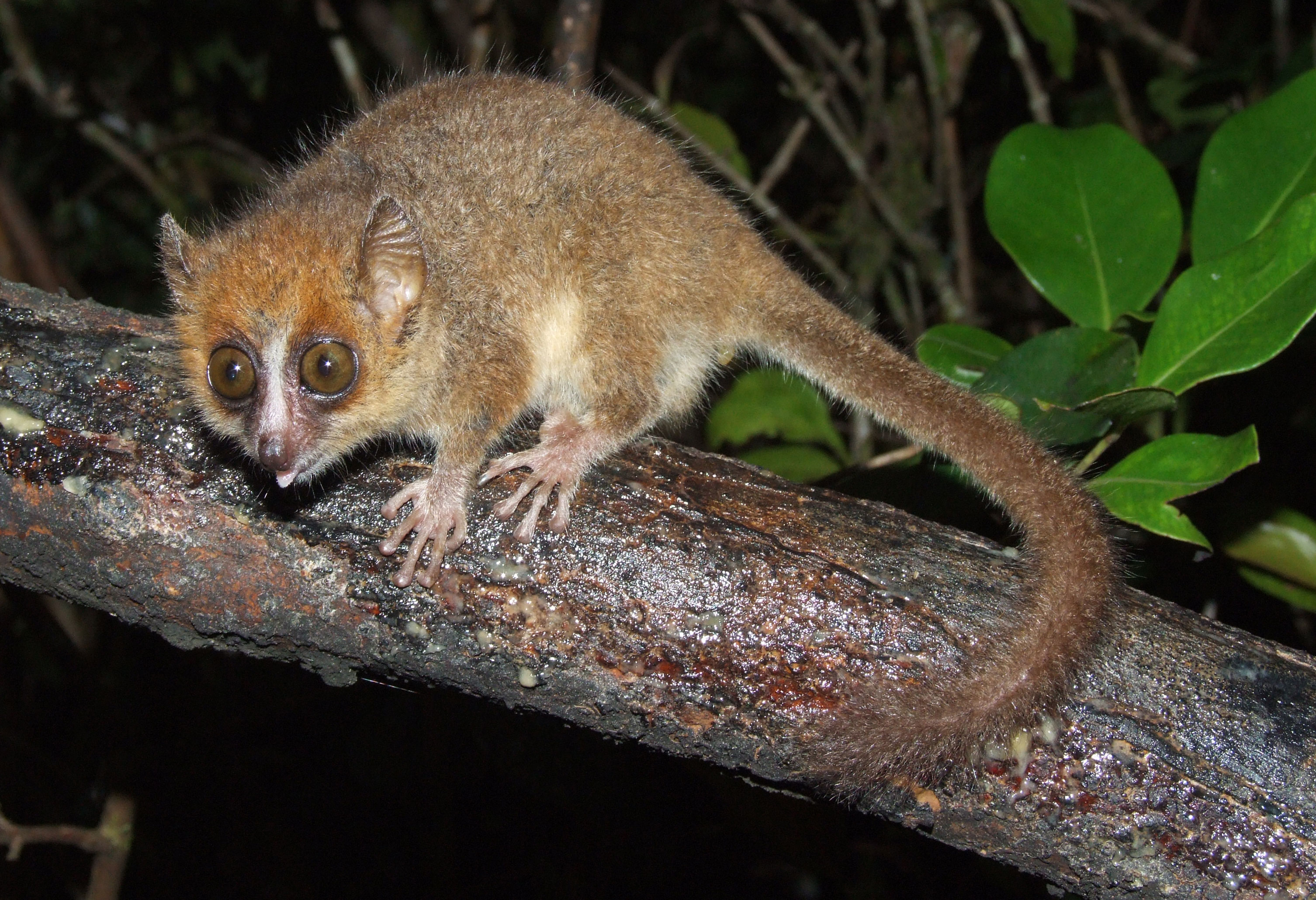
Pygmy mouse lemur

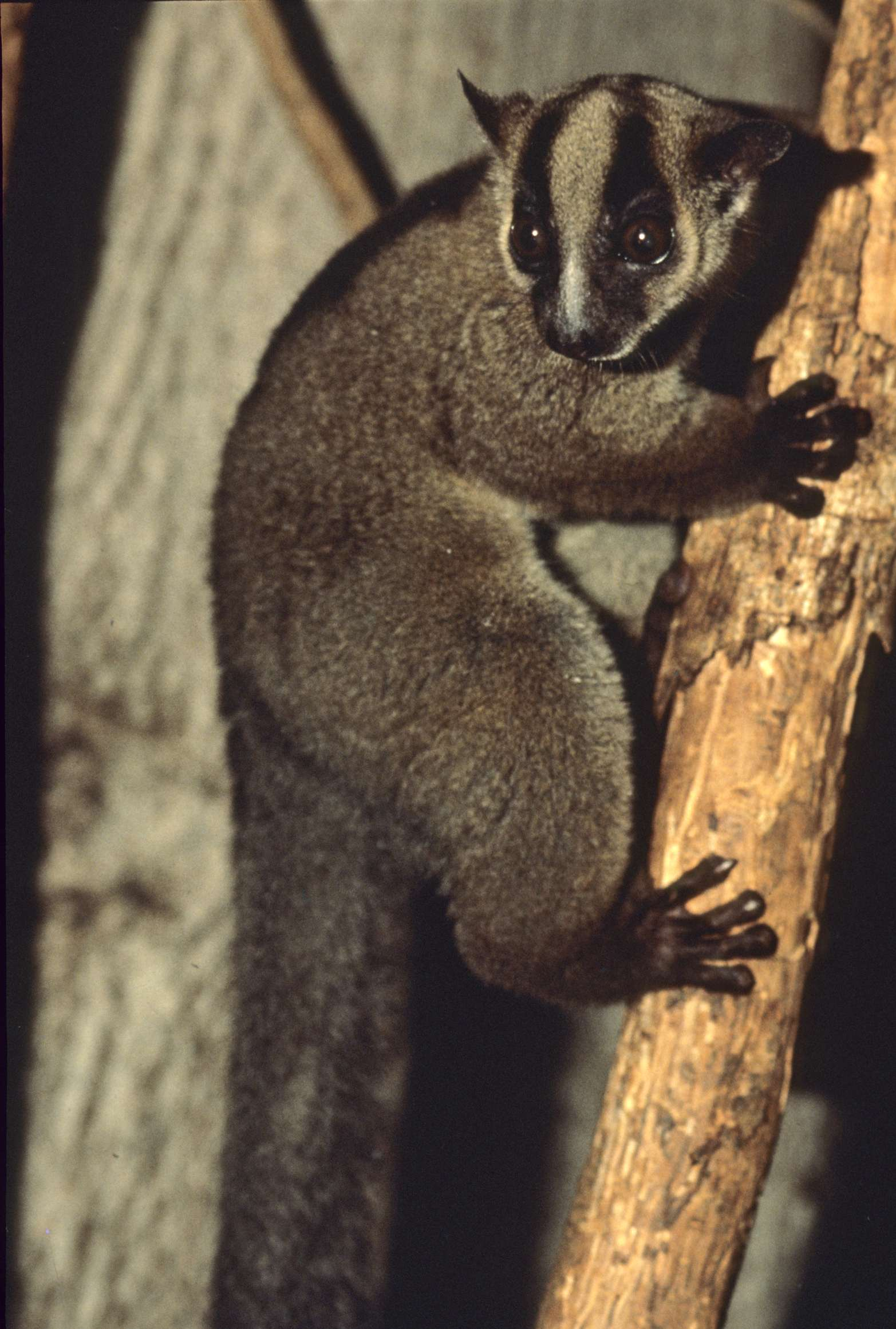
Pale fork-marked lemur

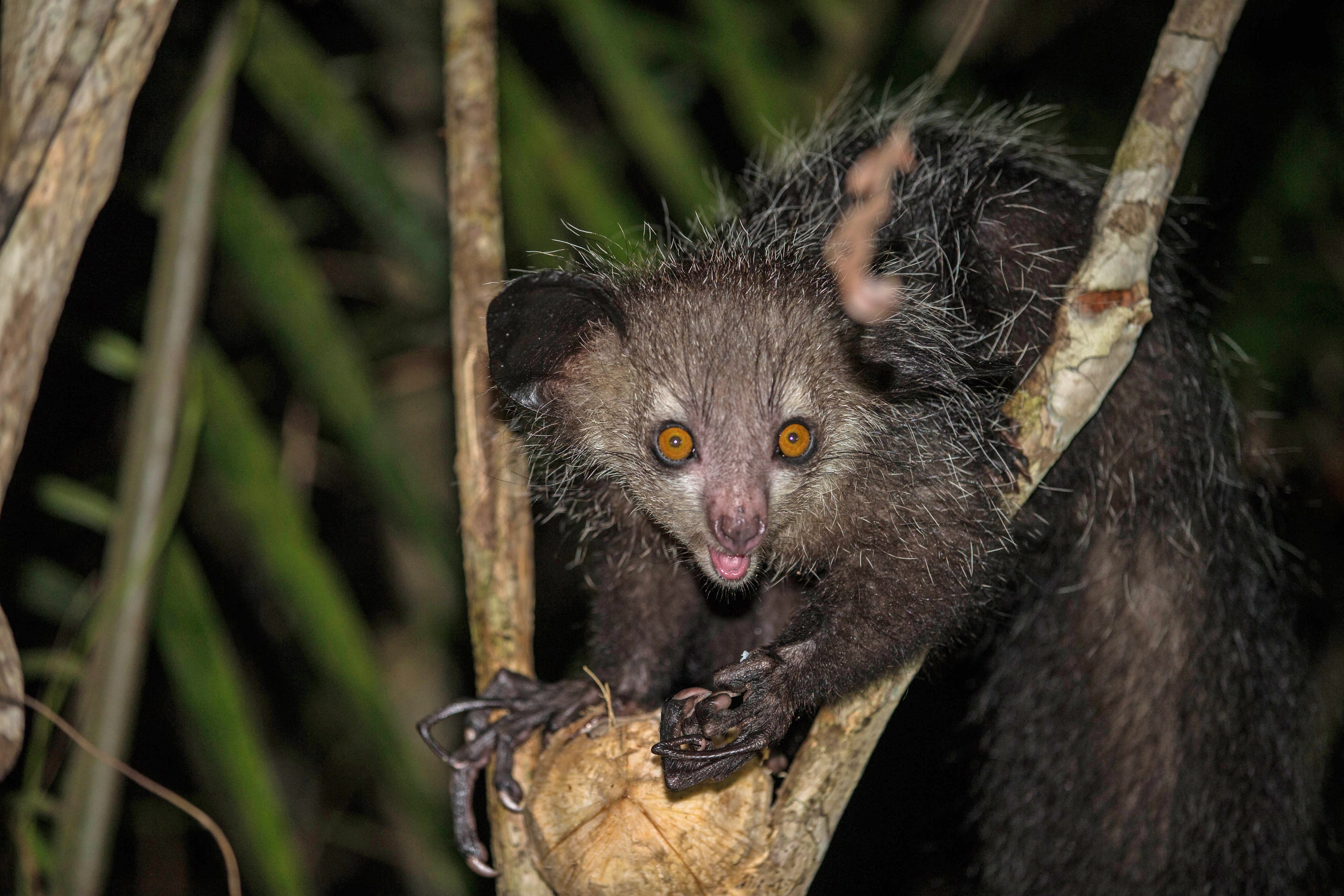
Aye-aye

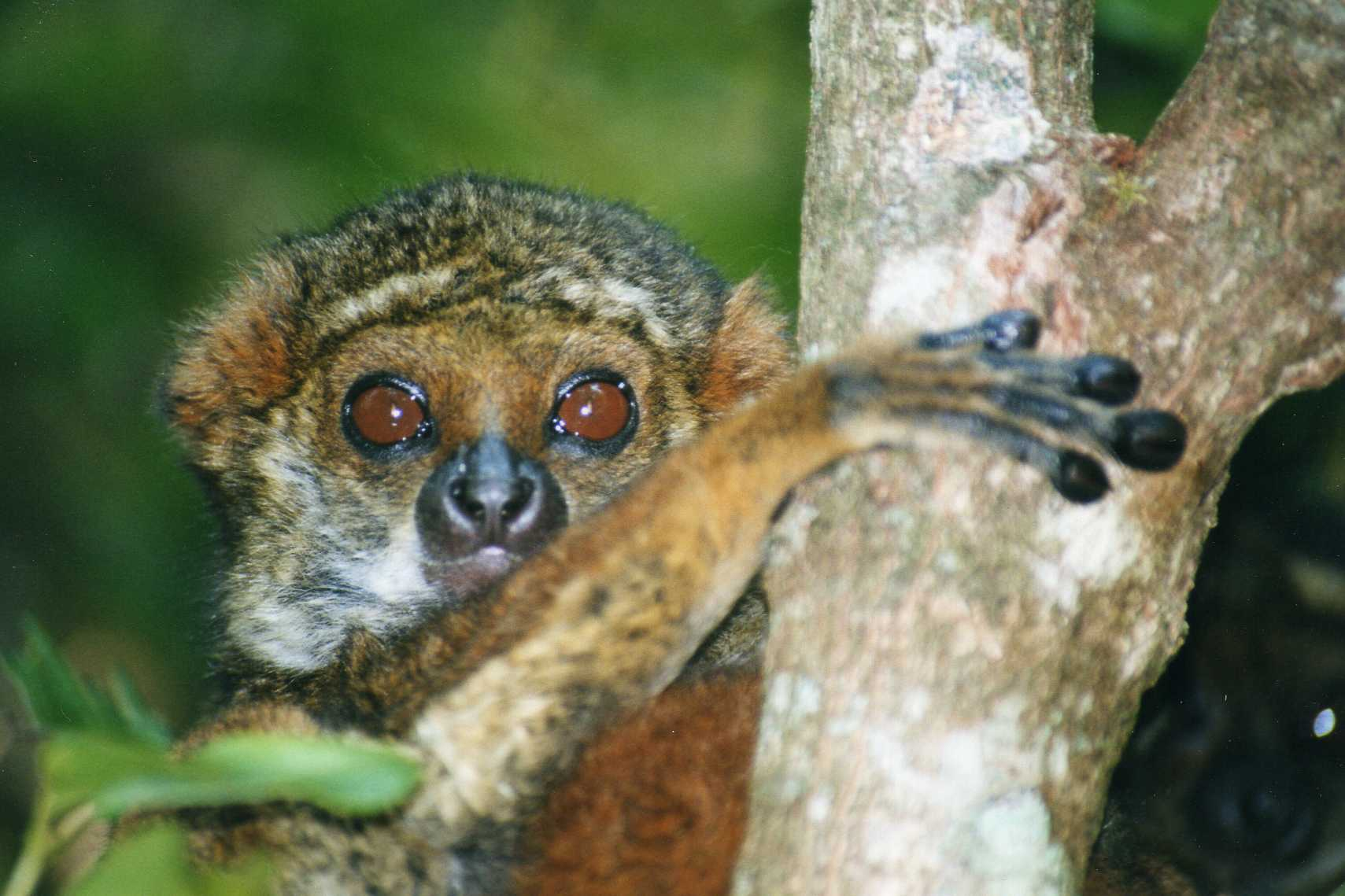
Eastern woolly lemur

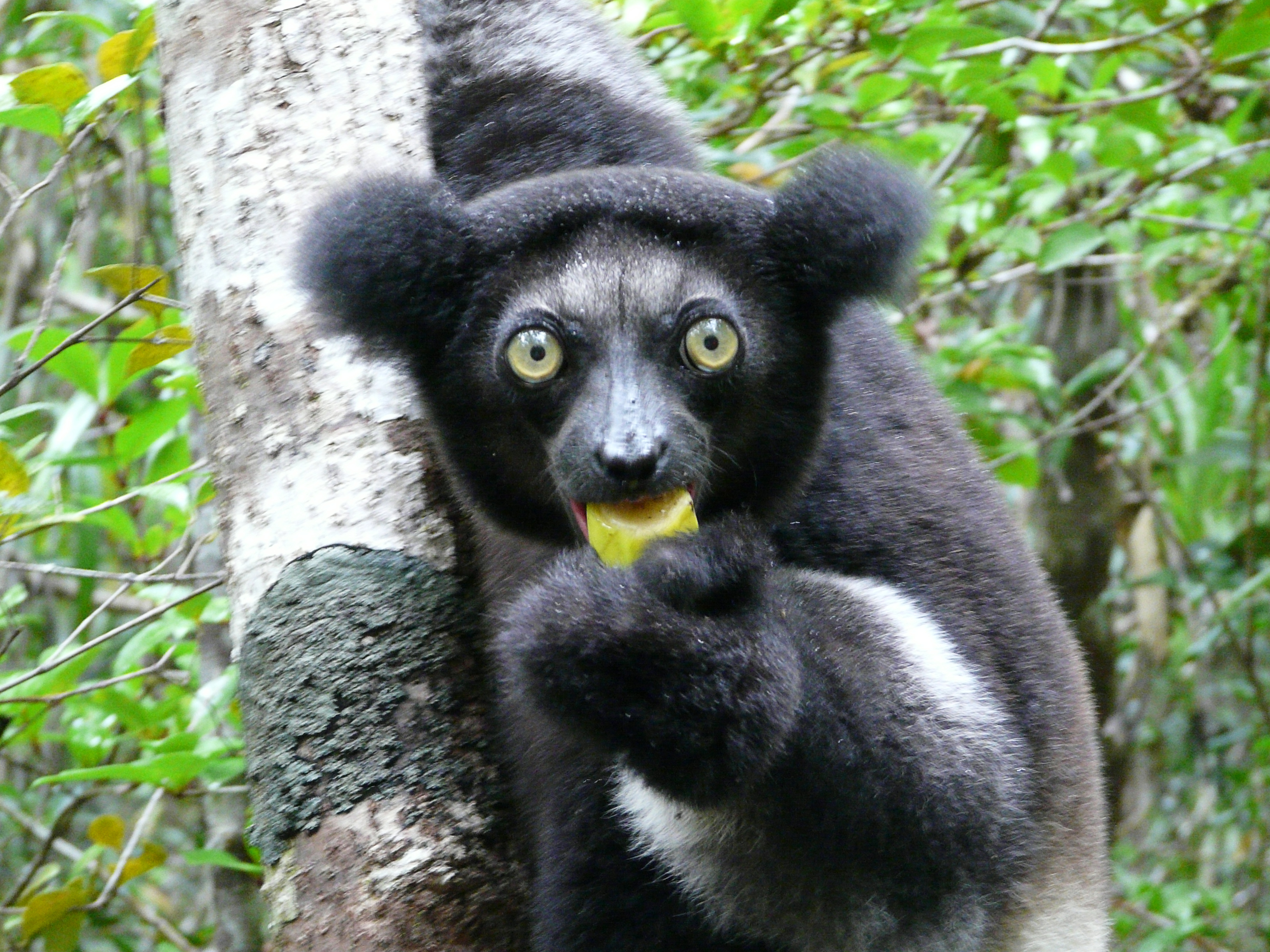
Indri

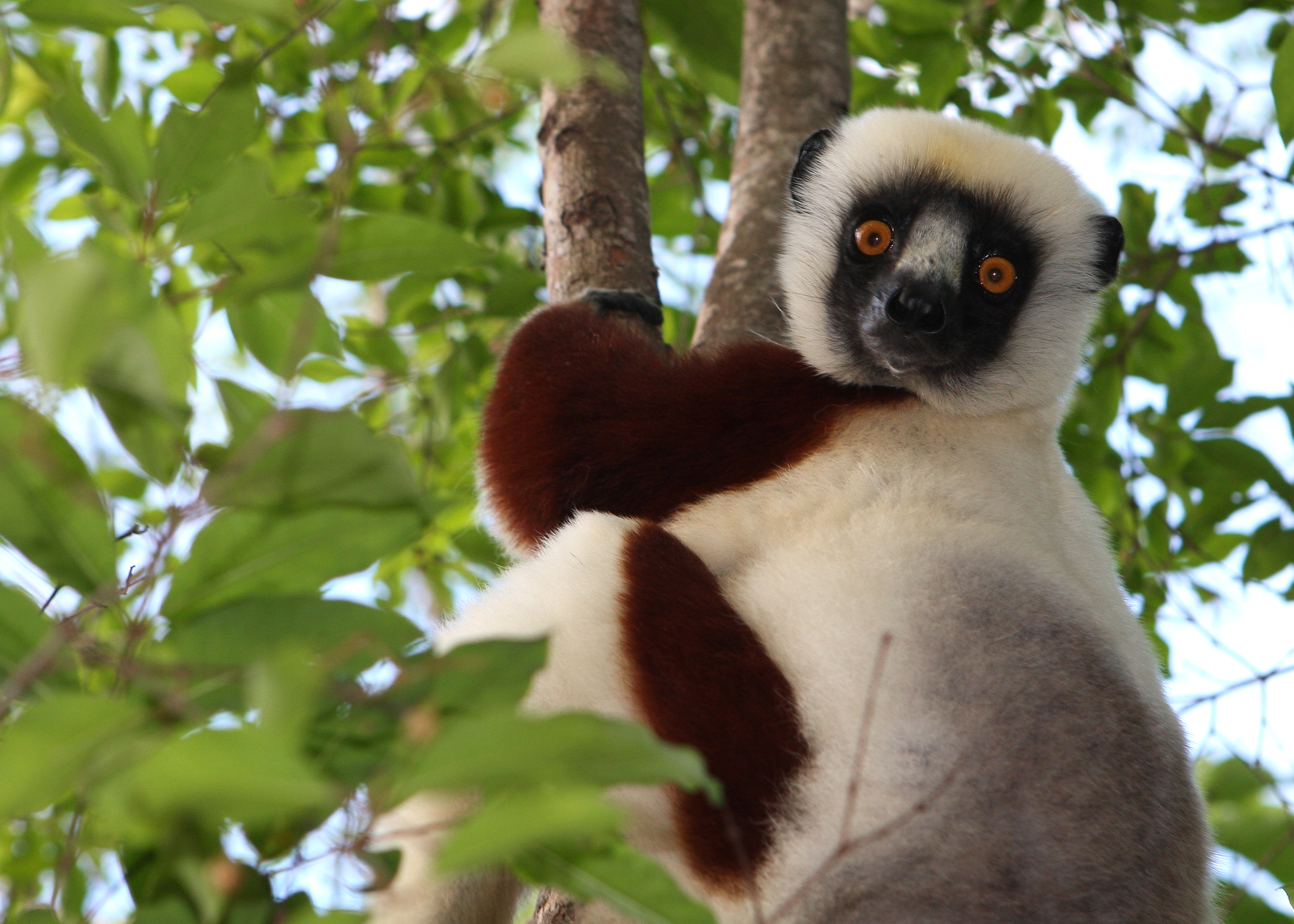
Coquerel's sifaka

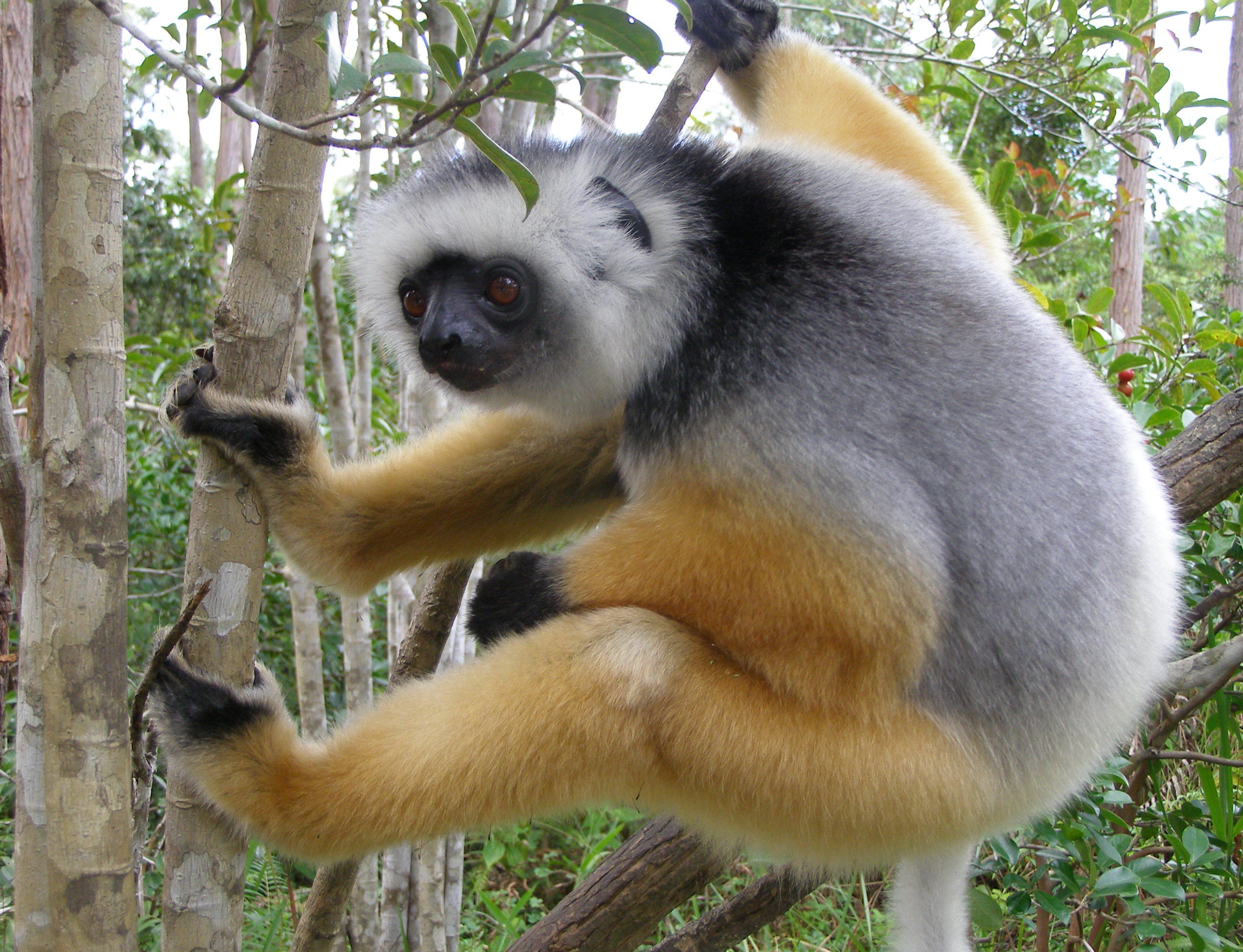
Diademed sifaka

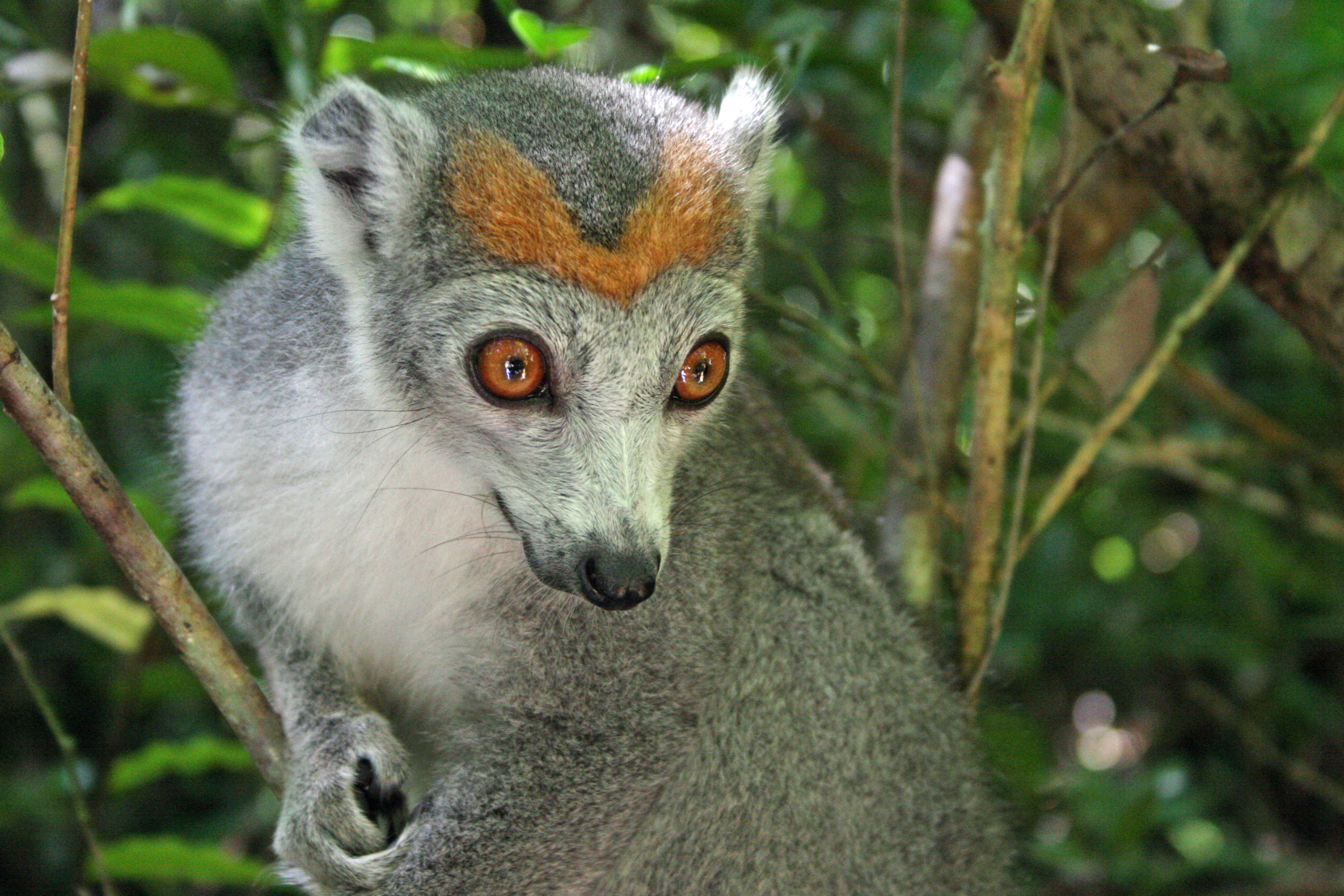
Crowned lemur

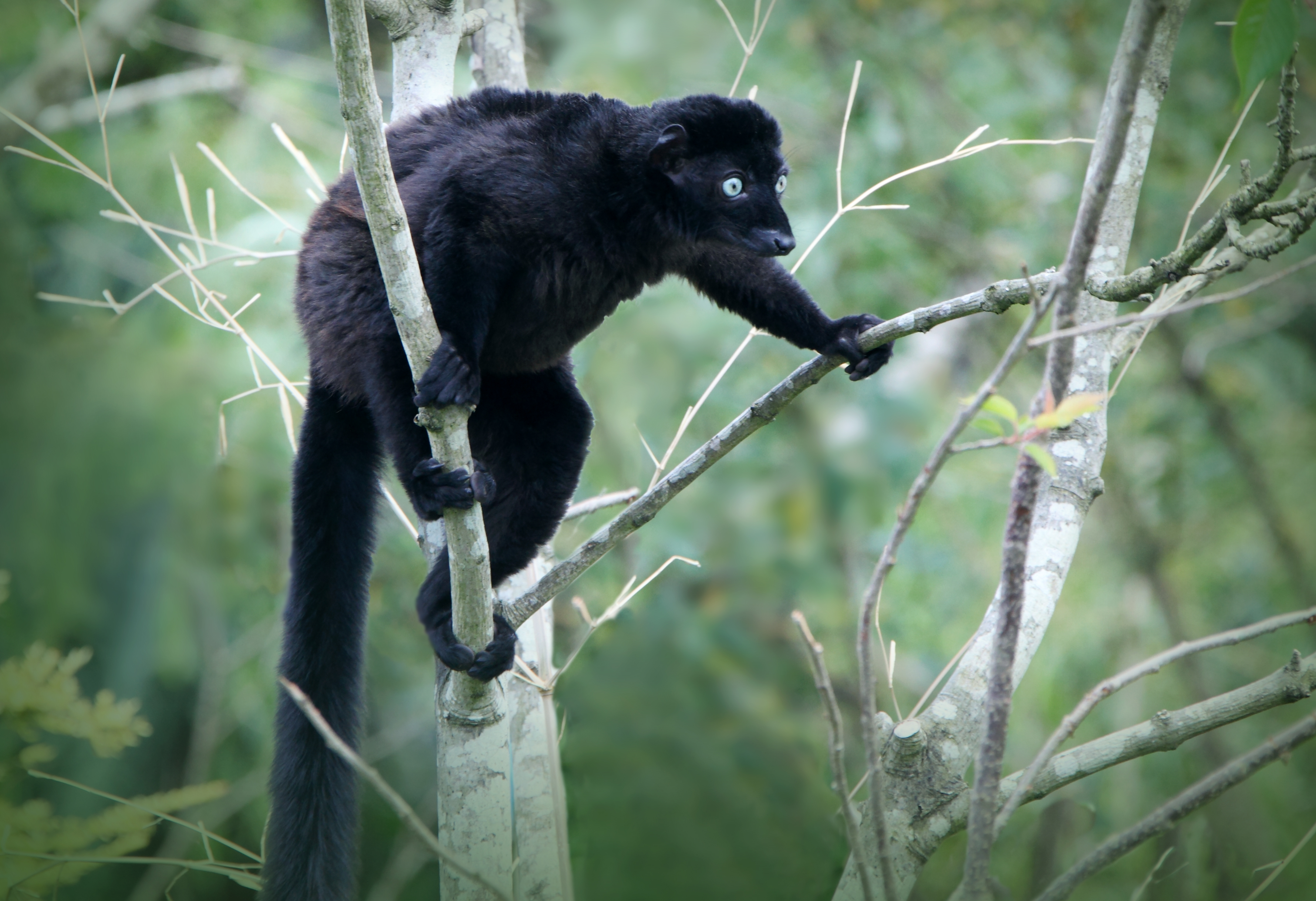
Blue-eyed black lemur

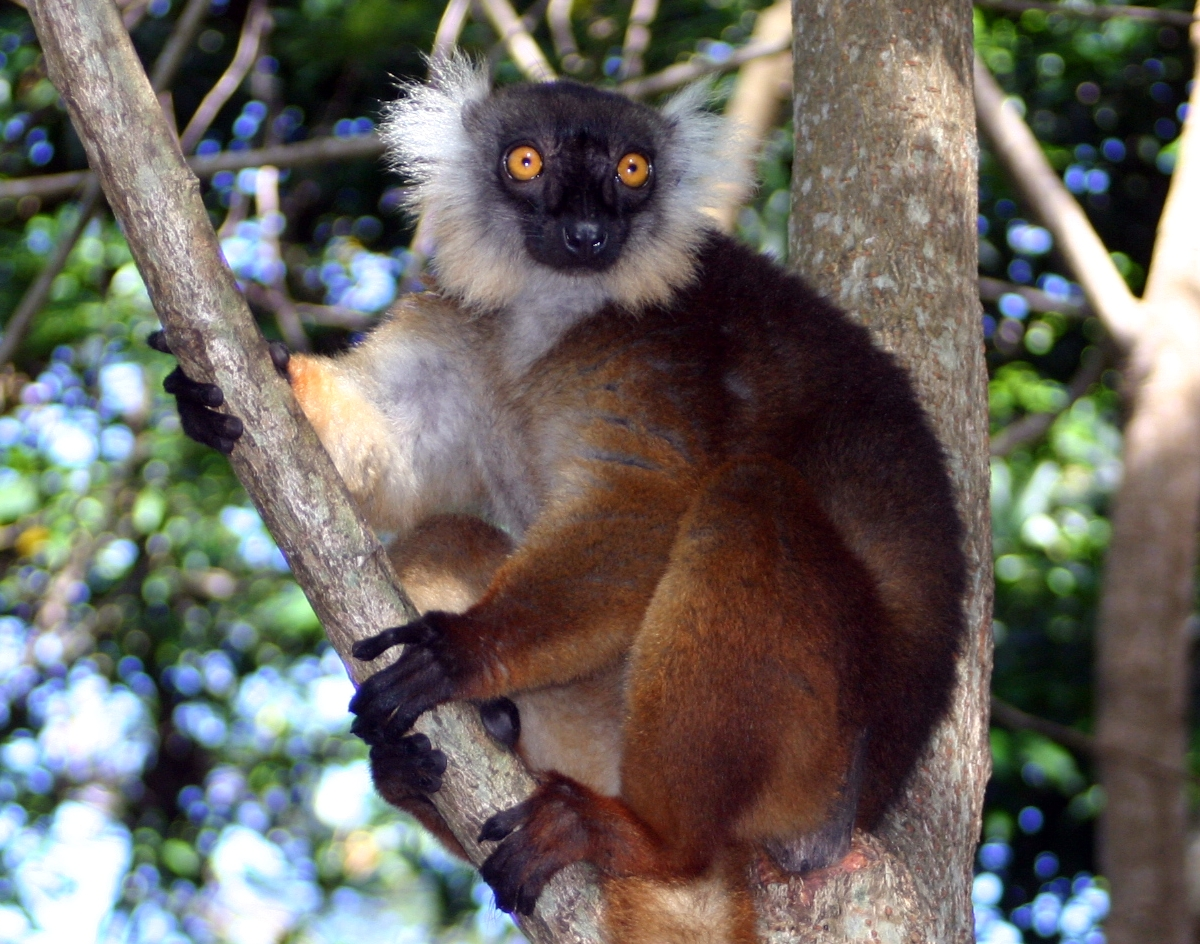
Black lemur

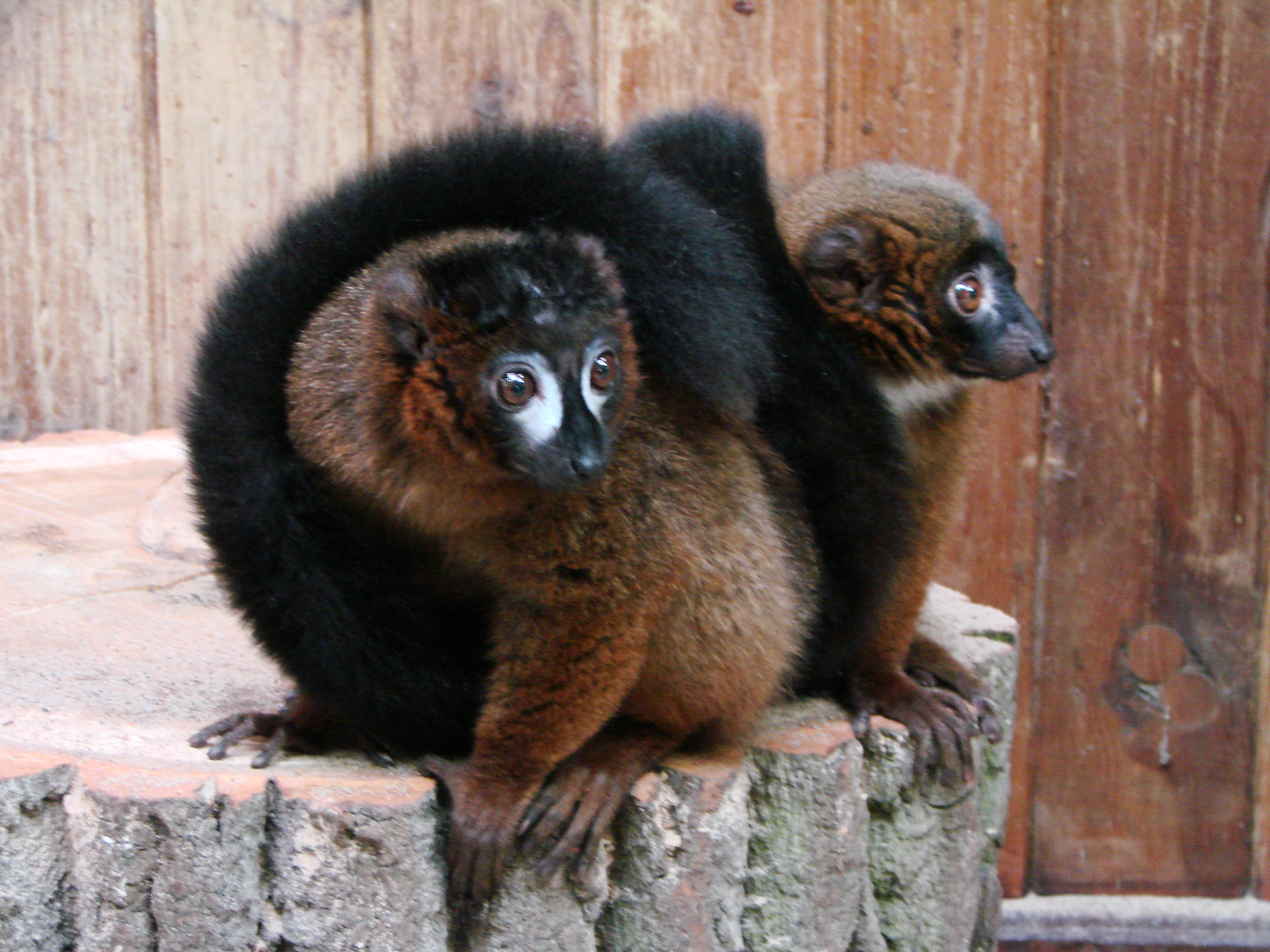
Red-bellied lemurs

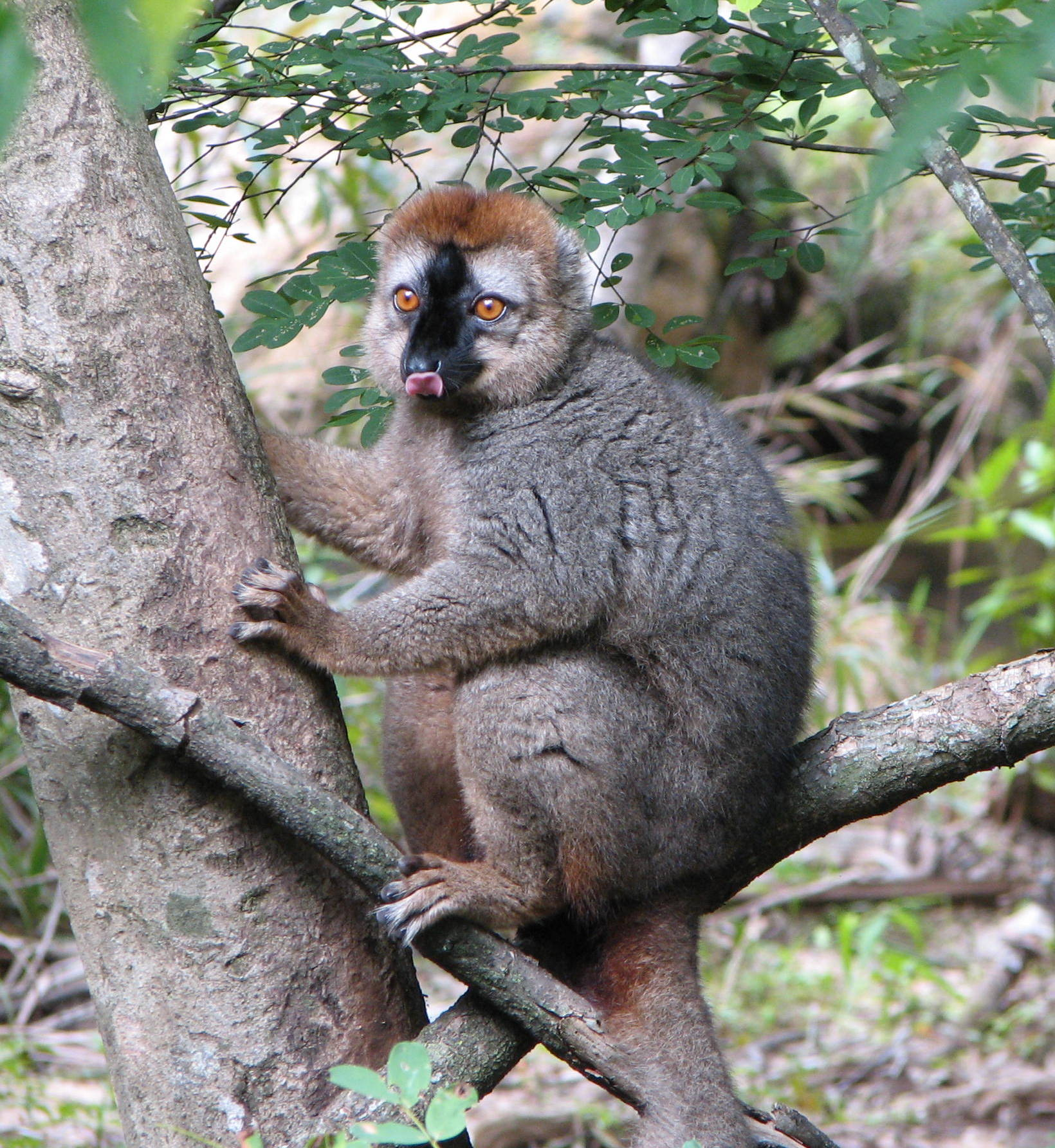
Red lemur

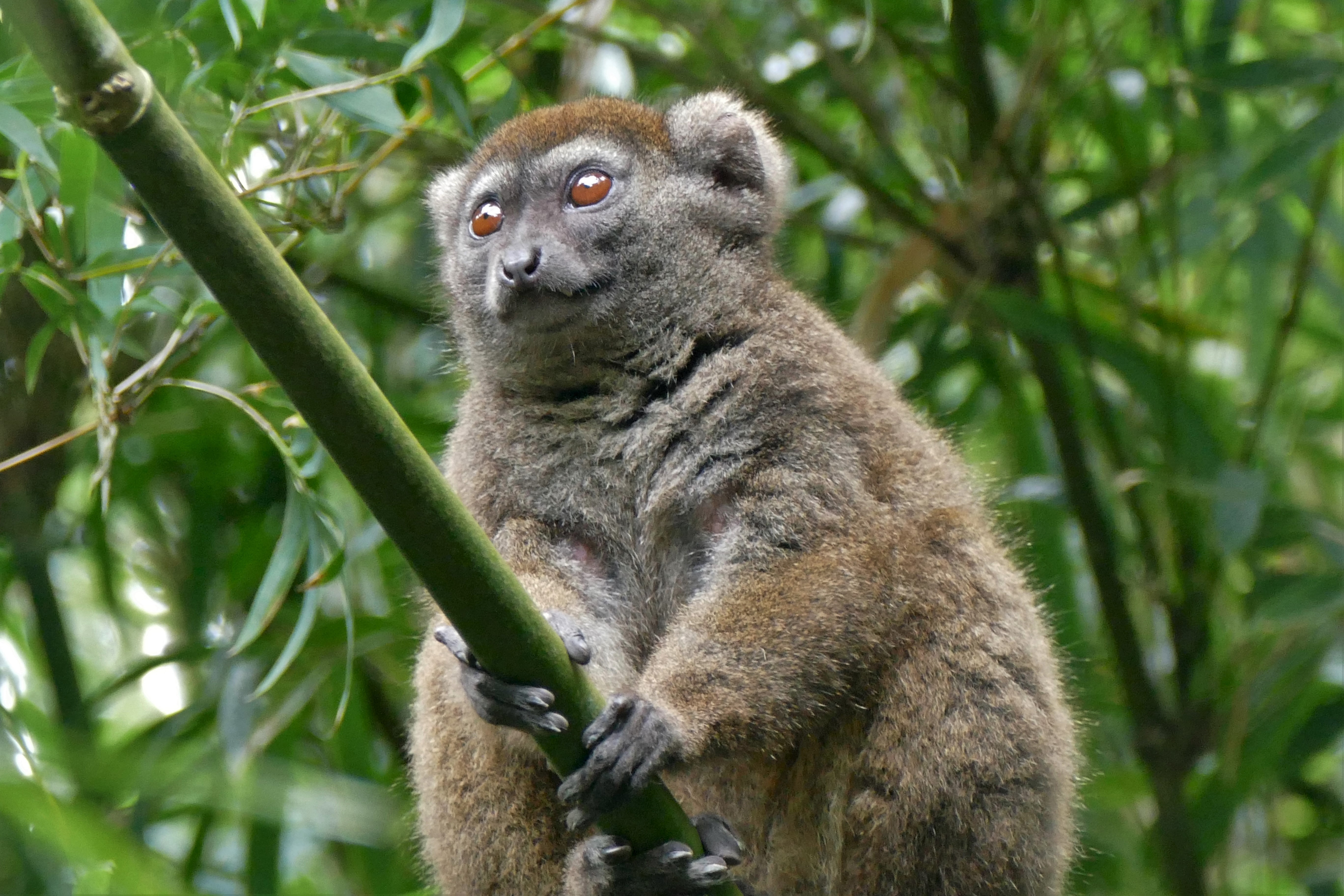
Southern lesser bamboo lemur

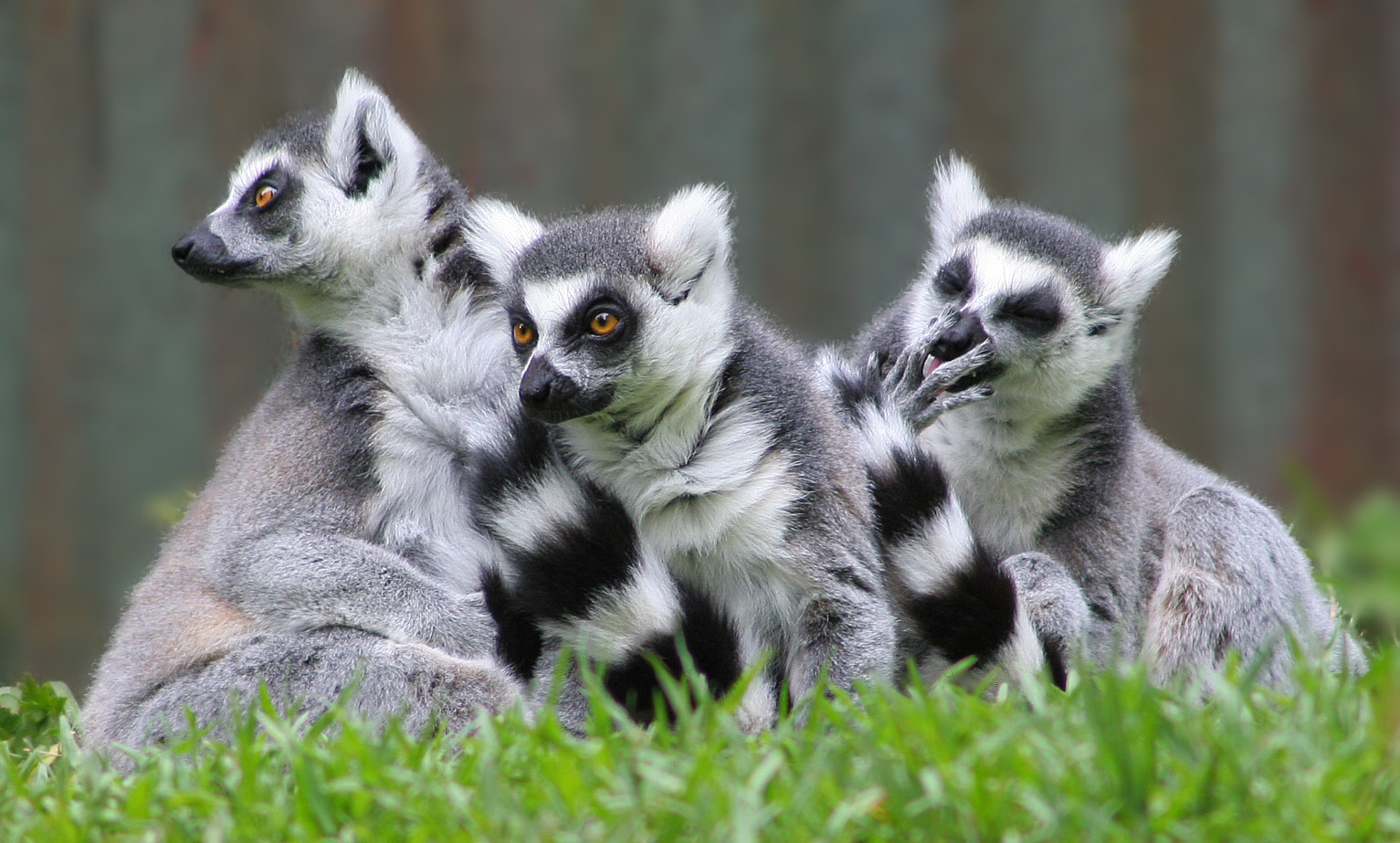
Ring-tailed lemurs

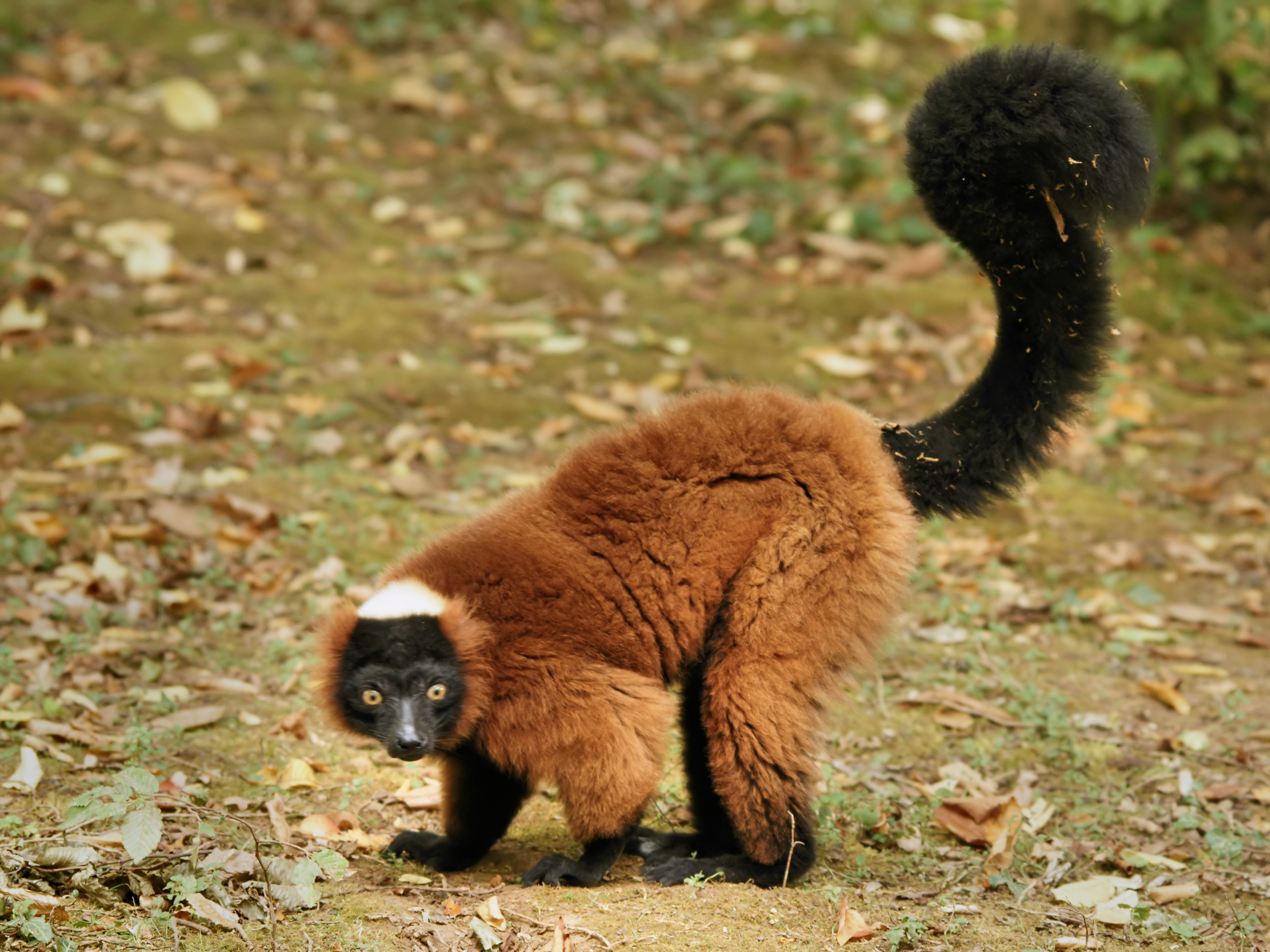
Red ruffed lemur

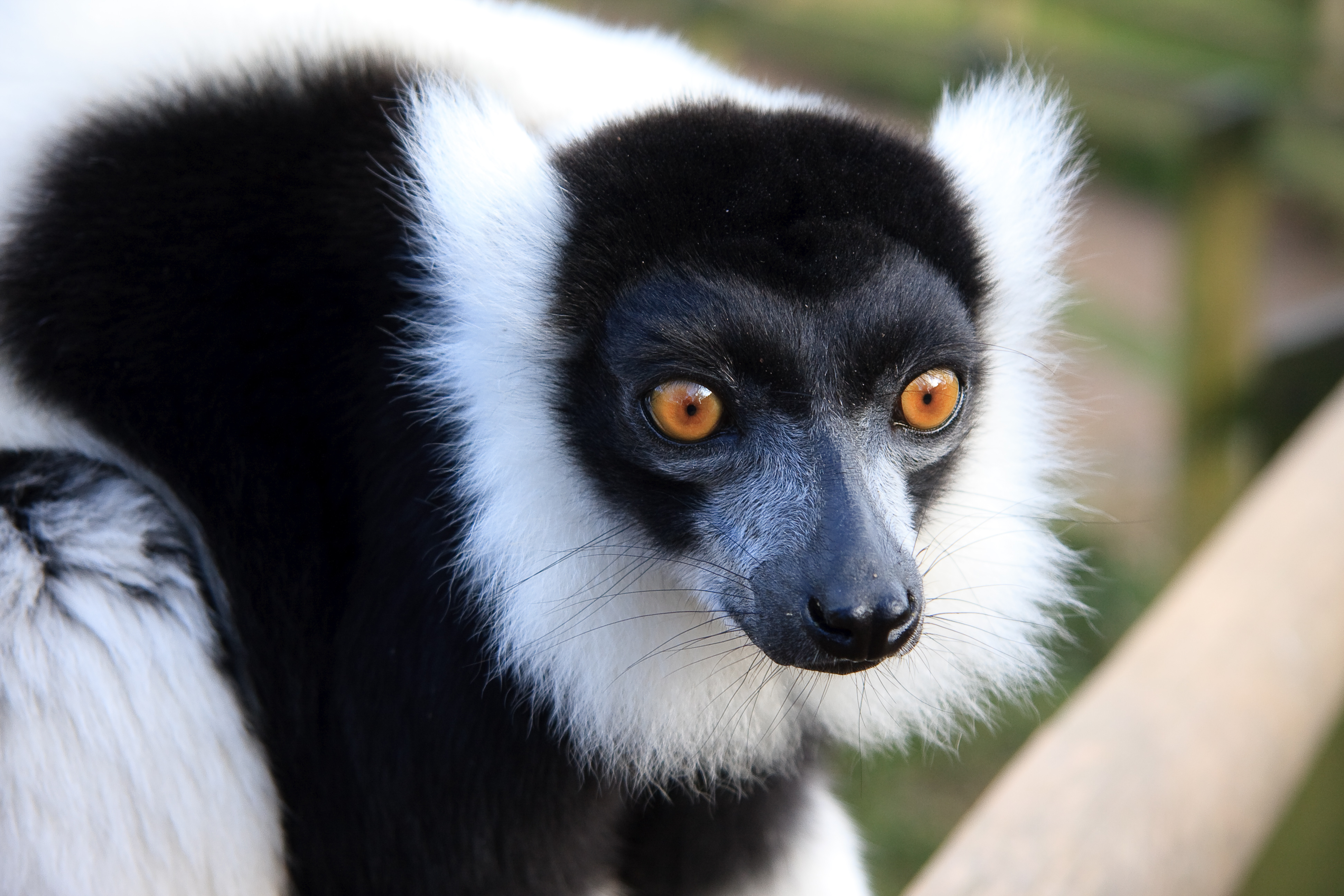
Black-and-white ruffed lemur

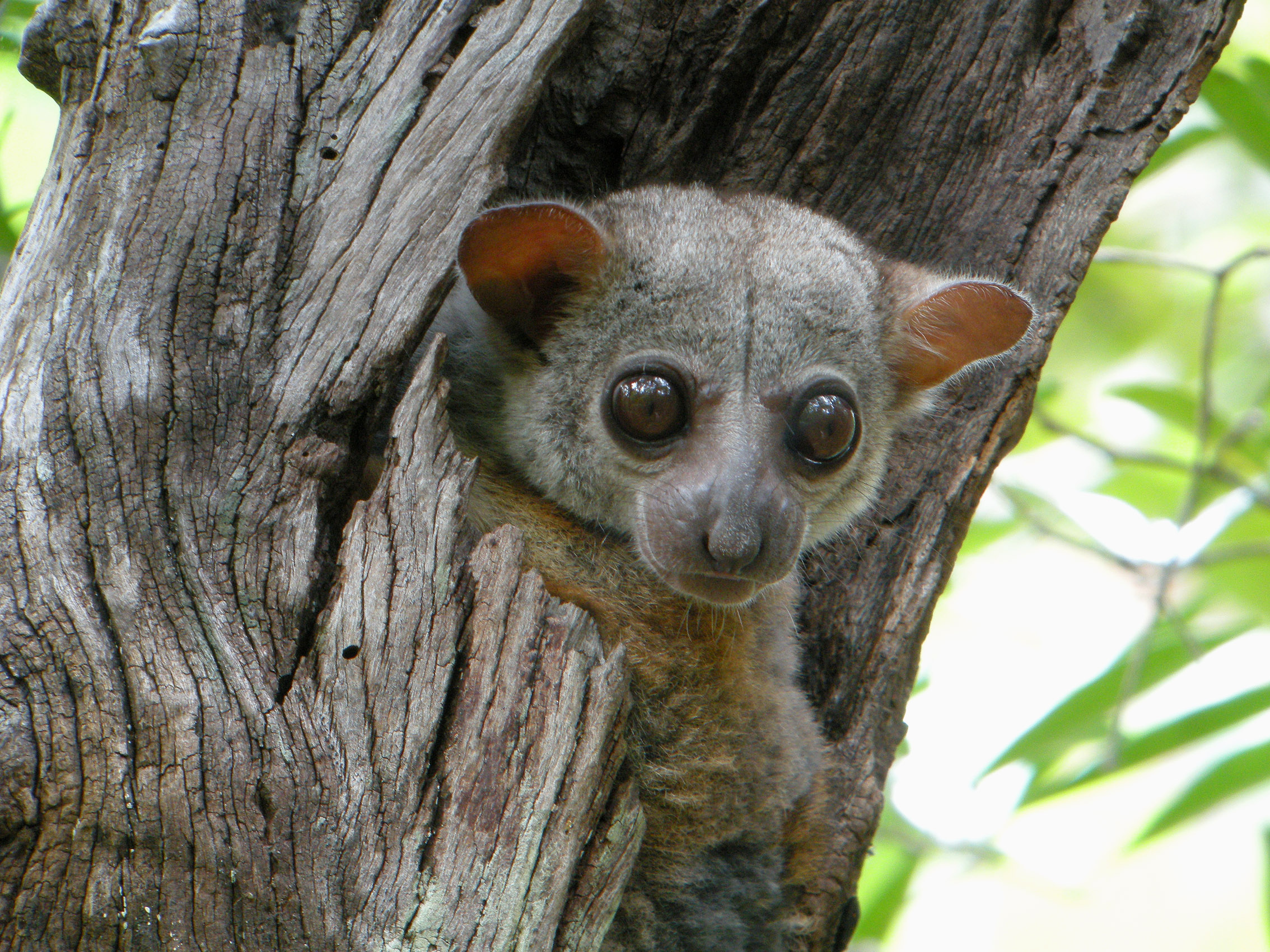
Milne-Edwards' sportive lemur

The order Primates contains all the species commonly related to the lemurs, monkeys, and apes, with the latter category including humans. It is divided into four main groupings: strepsirrhines, tarsiers, monkeys of the New World, and monkeys and apes of the Old World. Strepsirrhines make up all of Madagascar's native primates species, but comprise only a quarter of those of Africa, the rest being simians. Madagascar's strepsirrhines occupy both diurnal and nocturnal niches, while all those of Asia and mainland Africa are nocturnal and nearly all simians are diurnal (the only exception being neotropical Aotus, which lives where strepsirrhines are absent). Madagascar's 15 genera of extant nonhuman primates compares with 6 in Central America, 20 in South America, 23 in Africa and 19 in Asia. A number of lemur species larger than any now alive, ranging in size up to that of a gorilla, are believed to have become extinct shortly after the recent arrival of humans.

The endemic primates of Madagascar, the lemurs, constitute a single clade and are the largest branch of strepsirrhines. It has been proposed that a common ancestor of all Madagascar's lemurs rafted across the Mozambique Channel from Africa (Note: Mittermeier et al. 2006, pp. 23–26) between 50 and 60 million years ago. However, findings of similarities in dentition between several African primate fossils and aye-ayes, the most basal of lemurs, have led to the alternate proposal that the ancestors of aye-ayes colonized Madagascar separately from other lemurs.

Between 2000 and 2008, 39 new lemur species were described, bringing the total number of recognized species and subspecies to 99; by 2014, the number of extant species and subspecies recognized had increased to 105. Of these, the IUCN classified 24 as critically endangered, 49 as endangered, 20 as vulnerable, three as near threatened, three as of least concern and four as data deficient; two were yet to be evaluated.

- Suborder: Strepsirrhini
  - Infraorder: Lemuriformes
    - Family: Cheirogaleidae
      - Genus: Allocebus
        - Hairy-eared dwarf lemur, Allocebus trichotis EN
      - Genus: Cheirogaleus
        - Montagne d'Ambre dwarf lemur, Cheirogaleus andysabini EN
        - Furry-eared dwarf lemur, Cheirogaleus crossleyi VU
        - Groves' dwarf lemur, Cheirogaleus grovesi DD
        - Lavasoa dwarf lemur, Cheirogaleus lavasoensis EN
        - Greater dwarf lemur, Cheirogaleus major VU
        - Fat-tailed dwarf lemur, Cheirogaleus medius VU
        - Lesser iron-gray dwarf lemur, Cheirogaleus minusculus DD
        - Ankarana dwarf lemur, Cheirogaleus shethi EN
        - Sibree's dwarf lemur, Cheirogaleus sibreei CR
      - Genus: Microcebus
        - Arnhold's mouse lemur, Microcebus arnholdi VU
        - Madame Berthe's mouse lemur, Microcebus berthae CR
        - Bongolava mouse lemur, Microcebus bongolavensis EN
        - Boraha mouse lemur, Microcebus boraha DD
        - Danfoss' mouse lemur, Microcebus danfossi VU
        - Ganzhorn's mouse lemur, Microcebus ganzhorni EN
        - Gerp's mouse lemur, Microcebus gerpi CR
        - Reddish-gray mouse lemur, Microcebus griseorufus LC
        - Jolly's mouse lemur, Microcebus jollyae EN
        - Goodman's mouse lemur, Microcebus lehilahytsara VU
        - MacArthur's mouse lemur, Microcebus macarthurii EN
        - Claire's mouse lemur, Microcebus mamiratra EN
        - Manitatra mouse lemur, Microcebus manitatra CR
        - Margot Marsh's mouse lemur, Microcebus margotmarshae EN
        - Marohita mouse lemur, Microcebus marohita CR
        - Mittermeier's mouse lemur, Microcebus mittermeieri EN
        - Gray mouse lemur, Microcebus murinus LC
        - Pygmy mouse lemur, Microcebus myoxinus VU
        - Golden-brown mouse lemur, Microcebus ravelobensis VU
        - Brown mouse lemur, Microcebus rufus VU
        - Sambirano mouse lemur, Microcebus sambiranensis EN
        - Simmons' mouse lemur, Microcebus simmonsi EN
        - Anosy mouse lemur, Microcebus tanosi EN
        - Northern rufous mouse lemur, Microcebus tavaratra VU
      - Genus: Mirza
        - Coquerel's giant mouse lemur, Mirza coquereli EN
        - Northern giant mouse lemur, Mirza zaza VU
      - Genus: Phaner
        - Amber Mountain fork-marked lemur, Phaner electromontis EN
        - Masoala fork-marked lemur, Phaner furcifer EN
        - Pale fork-marked lemur, Phaner pallescens EN
        - Pariente's fork-marked lemur, Phaner parienti EN
    - Family: Daubentoniidae
      - Genus: Daubentonia
        - Aye-aye, Daubentonia madagascariensis EN
    - Family: Indriidae
      - Genus: Avahi
        - Betsileo woolly lemur, Avahi betsileo EN
        - Bemaraha woolly lemur, Avahi cleesei CR
        - Eastern woolly lemur, Avahi laniger VU
        - Southern woolly lemur, Avahi meridionalis EN
        - Moore's woolly lemur, Avahi mooreorum EN
        - Western woolly lemur, Avahi occidentalis VU
        - Peyrieras's woolly lemur, Avahi peyrierasi VU
        - Ramanantsoavana's woolly lemur, Avahi ramanantsoavanai VU
        - Sambirano woolly lemur, Avahi unicolor CR
      - Genus: Indri
        - Indri, Indri indri CR
      - Genus: Propithecus
        - Silky sifaka, Propithecus candidus CR
        - Coquerel's sifaka, Propithecus coquereli CR
        - Crowned sifaka, Propithecus coronatus CR
        - Von der Decken's sifaka, Propithecus deckenii CR
        - Diademed sifaka, Propithecus diadema CR
        - Milne-Edwards's sifaka, Propithecus edwardsi EN
        - Perrier's sifaka, Propithecus perrieri CR
        - Golden-crowned sifaka, Propithecus tattersalli CR
        - Verreaux's sifaka, Propithecus verreauxi CR
    - Family: Lemuridae (large lemurs)
      - Genus: Eulemur
        - White-headed lemur, Eulemur albifrons VU
        - Gray-headed lemur, Eulemur cinereiceps CR
        - Collared brown lemur, Eulemur collaris EN
        - Crowned lemur, Eulemur coronatus EN
        - Blue-eyed black lemur, Eulemur flavifrons CR
        - Common brown lemur, Eulemur fulvus VU
        - Black lemur, Eulemur macaco EN
        - Mongoose lemur, Eulemur mongoz CR
        - Red-bellied lemur, Eulemur rubriventer VU
        - Red-fronted lemur, Eulemur rufifrons VU
        - Red lemur, Eulemur rufus VU
        - Sanford's brown lemur, Eulemur sanfordi EN
      - Genus: Hapalemur
        - Lac Alaotra bamboo lemur, Hapalemur alaotrensis CR
        - Golden bamboo lemur, Hapalemur aureus CR
        - Eastern lesser bamboo lemur, Hapalemur griseus VU
          - Beanamalao bamboo lemur, Hapalemur griseus gilberti DD
          - Eastern lesser bamboo lemur, Hapalemur griseus griseus VU
          - Ranomafana bamboo lemur, Hapalemur griseus ranomafanensis VU
        - Southern lesser bamboo lemur, Hapalemur meridionalis VU
        - Western lesser bamboo lemur, Hapalemur occidentalis VU
        - Greater bamboo lemur, Hapalemur simus CR
      - Genus: Lemur
        - Ring-tailed lemur, Lemur catta EN
      - Genus: Varecia
        - Red ruffed lemur, Varecia rubra CR
        - Black-and-white ruffed lemur, Varecia variegata CR
          - Southern black-and-white ruffed lemur, Varecia variegata editorum CR
          - White-belted black-and-white ruffed lemur, Varecia variegata subcincta CR
          - Black-and-white ruffed lemur, Varecia variegata variegata CR
    - Family: Lepilemuridae
      - Genus: Lepilemur
        - Antafia sportive lemur, Lepilemur aeeclis EN
        - Ahmanson's sportive lemur, Lepilemur ahmansonorum CR
        - Ankarana sportive lemur, Lepilemur ankaranensis EN
        - Betsileo sportive lemur, Lepilemur betsileo EN
        - Gray-backed sportive lemur, Lepilemur dorsalis EN
        - Milne-Edwards' sportive lemur, Lepilemur edwardsi EN
        - Fleurete's sportive lemur, Lepilemur fleuretae EN
        - Grewcock's sportive lemur, Lepilemur grewcockorum CR
        - Holland's sportive lemur, Lepilemur hollandorum CR
        - Hubbard's sportive lemur, Lepilemur hubbardorum EN
        - James' sportive lemur, Lepilemur jamesorum CR
        - White-footed sportive lemur, Lepilemur leucopus EN
        - Small-toothed sportive lemur, Lepilemur microdon EN
        - Daraina sportive lemur, Lepilemur milanoii EN
        - Mittermeier's sportive lemur, Lepilemur mittermeieri CR
        - Weasel sportive lemur, Lepilemur mustelinus VU
        - Otto's sportive lemur, Lepilemur otto EN
        - Petter's sportive lemur, Lepilemur petteri EN
        - Randrianasolo's sportive lemur, Lepilemur randrianasoloi EN
        - Red-tailed sportive lemur, Lepilemur ruficaudatus CR
        - Sahamalaza sportive lemur, Lepilemur sahamalazensis CR
        - Scott's sportive lemur, Lepilemur scottorum EN
        - Seal's sportive lemur, Lepilemur seali VU
        - Northern sportive lemur, Lepilemur septentrionalis CR
        - Hawks' sportive lemur, Lepilemur tymerlachsonorum CR
        - Wright's sportive lemur, Lepilemur wrightae EN

== Order: Rodentia (rodents) ==
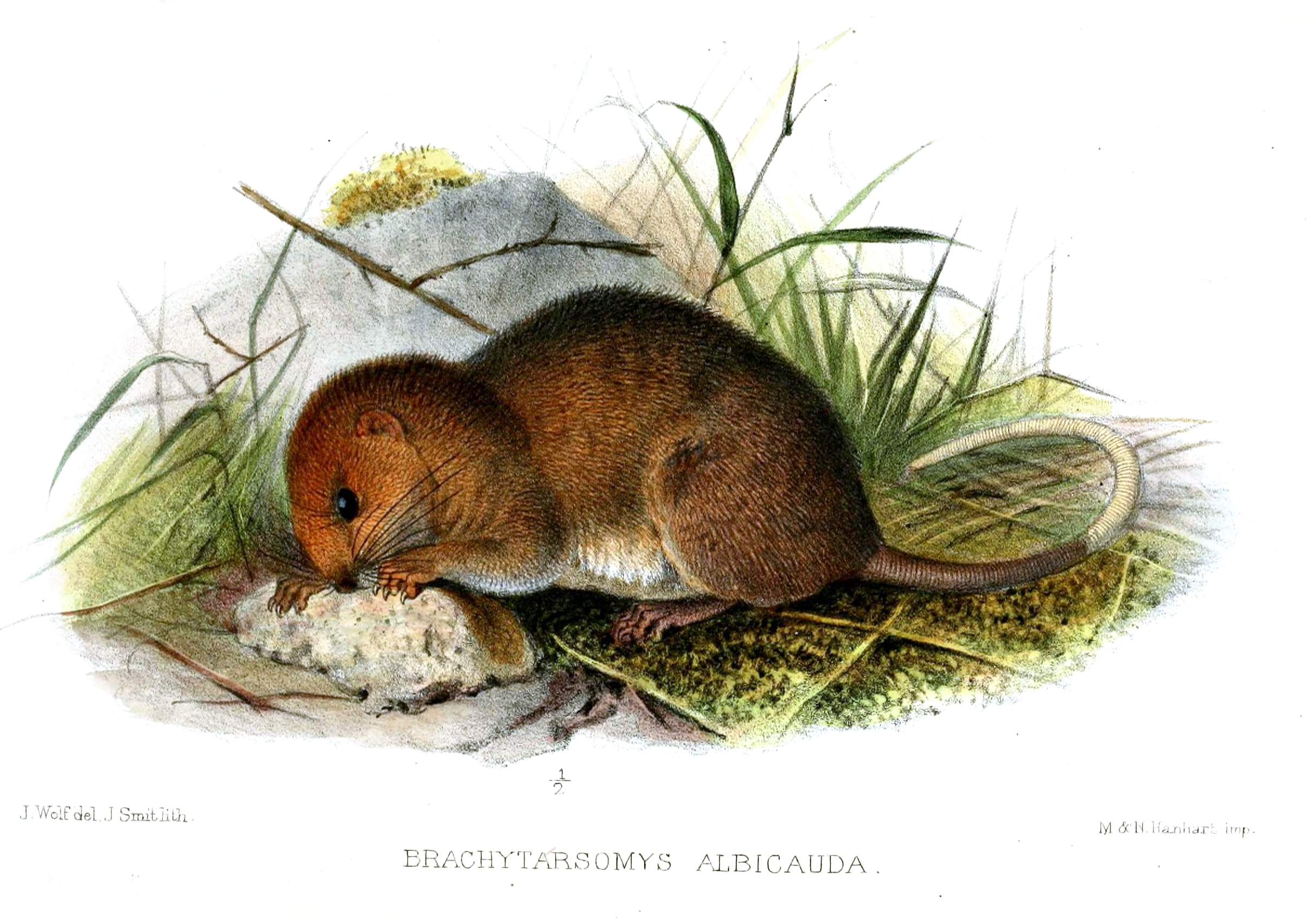
White-tailed antsangy

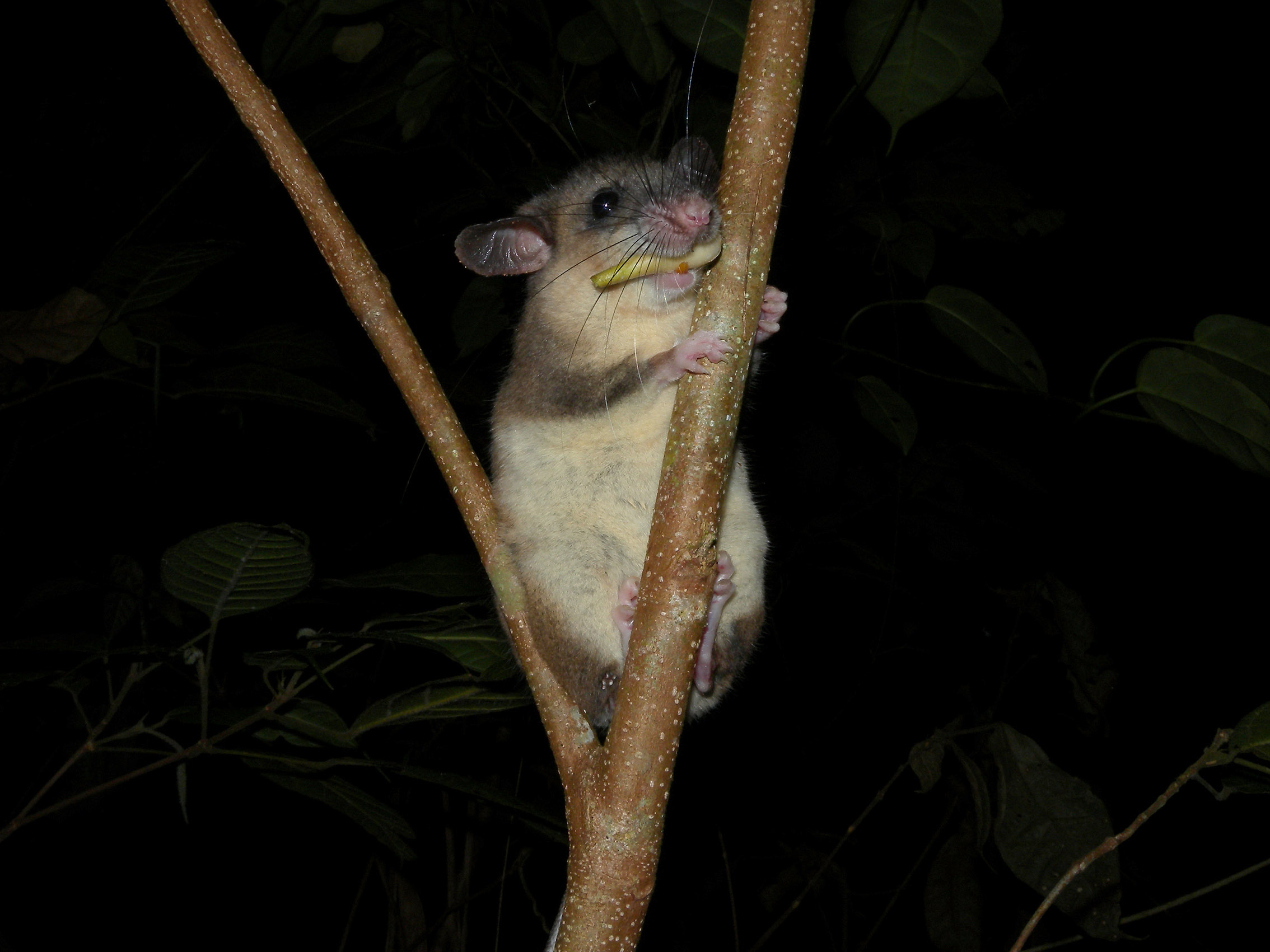
Eliurus species

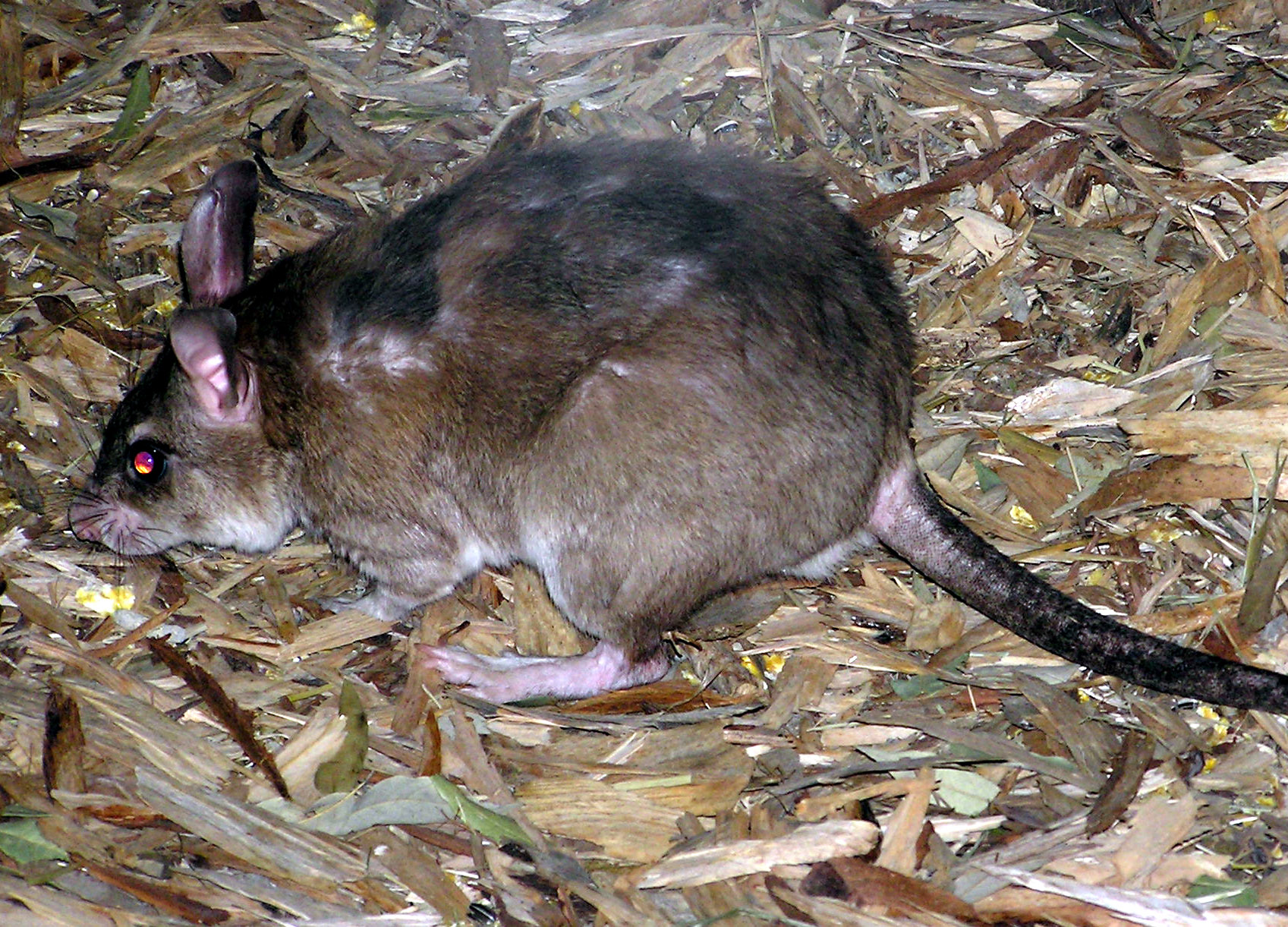
Malagasy giant rat

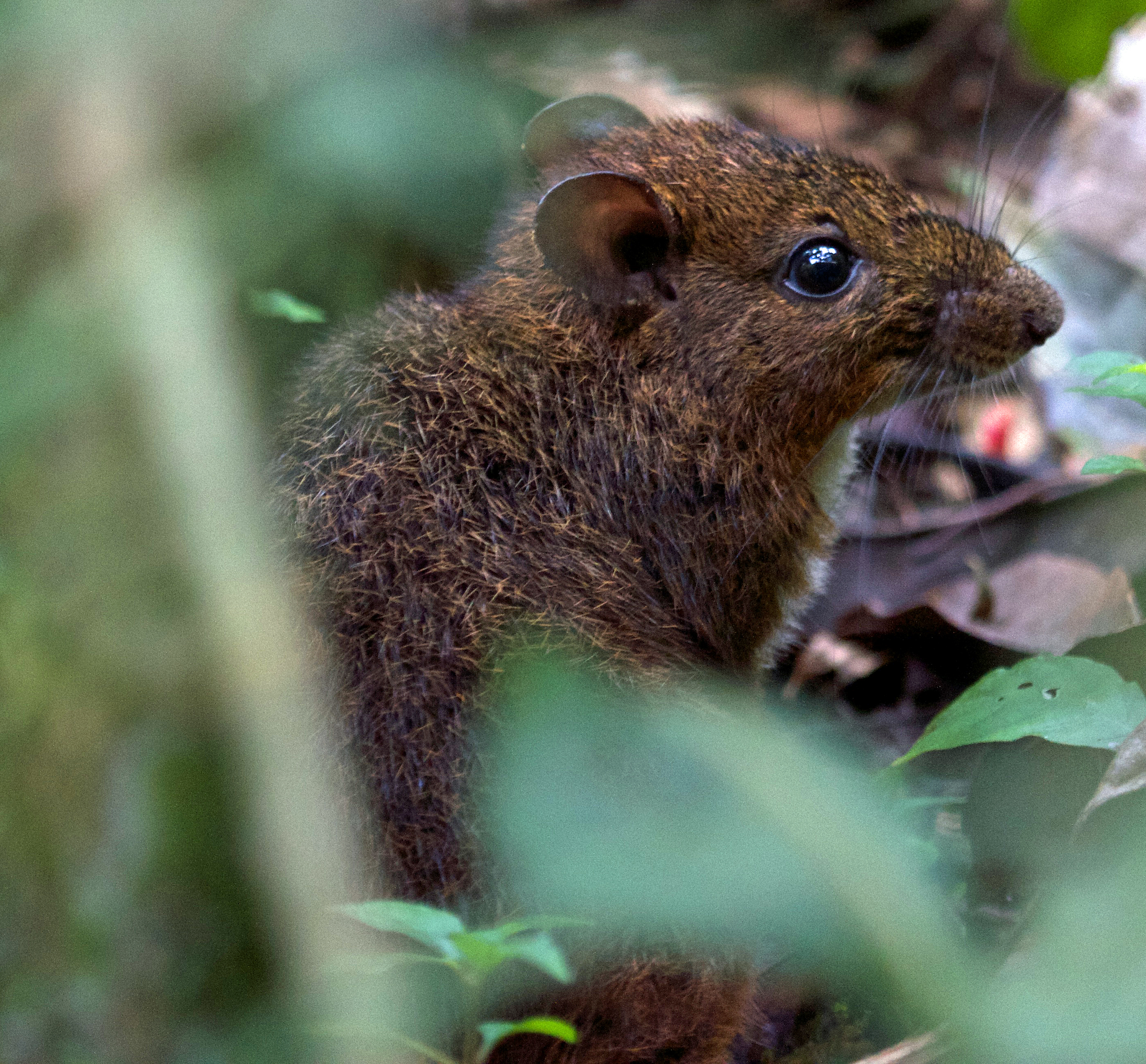
Island mouse

Rodents make up the largest order of mammals, with over 40% of mammalian species. They have two incisors in the upper and lower jaw which grow continually and must be kept short by gnawing. Most rodents are small though the capybara can weigh up to 45 kg (99 lb). All the native nesomyid rodents of Madagascar are believed to descend from a common ancestor that rafted over from Africa 20–24 million years ago. There are about 39 nesomyid species in five subfamilies in Africa, compared to 27 in one subfamily extant in Madagascar. While nesomyids make up all of the native rodent species of Madagascar, they constitute less than 10% of those of Africa.

- Suborder: Sciurognathi
  - Family: Nesomyidae
    - Subfamily: Nesomyinae
      - Genus: Brachytarsomys
        - White-tailed antsangy, Brachytarsomys albicauda LC
        - Hairy-tailed antsangy, Brachytarsomys villosa VU
      - Genus: Brachyuromys
        - Betsileo short-tailed rat, Brachyuromys betsileoensis LC
        - Gregarious short-tailed rat, Brachyuromys ramirohitra LC
      - Genus: Eliurus
        - Tsingy tufted-tailed rat, Eliurus antsingy DD
        - Ankarana Special Reserve tufted-tailed rat, Eliurus carletoni
        - Daniel's tufted-tailed rat, Eliurus danieli LC
        - Ellerman's tufted-tailed rat, Eliurus ellermani DD
        - Grandidier's tufted-tailed rat, Eliurus grandidieri LC
        - Major's tufted-tailed rat, Eliurus majori LC
        - Lesser tufted-tailed rat, Eliurus minor LC
        - Dormouse tufted-tailed rat, Eliurus myoxinus LC
        - White-tipped tufted-tailed rat, Eliurus penicillatus EN
        - Petter's tufted-tailed rat, Eliurus petteri EN
        - Tanala tufted-tailed rat, Eliurus tanala LC
        - Webb's tufted-tailed rat, Eliurus webbi LC
      - Genus: Gymnuromys
        - Voalavoanala, Gymnuromys roberti LC
      - Genus: Hypogeomys
        - Malagasy giant rat, Hypogeomys antimena EN
      - Genus: Macrotarsomys
        - Bastard big-footed mouse, Macrotarsomys bastardi LC
        - Greater big-footed mouse, Macrotarsomys ingens EN
        - Petter's big-footed mouse, Macrotarsomys petteri DD
      - Genus: Monticolomys
        - Malagasy mountain mouse, Monticolomys koopmani LC
      - Genus: Nesomys
        - White-bellied nesomys, Nesomys audeberti LC
        - Western nesomys, Nesomys lambertoni EN
        - Island mouse, Nesomys rufus LC
      - Genus: Voalavo
        - Eastern voalavo, Voalavo antsahabensis EN
        - Naked-tailed voalavo, Voalavo gymnocaudus LC

== Order: Eulipotyphla (shrews, hedgehogs, moles, and solenodons) ==
Eulipotyphlans are insectivorous mammals. Shrews and solenodons closely resemble mice, hedgehogs carry spines, while moles are stout-bodied burrowers. There are two species of shrew on Madagascar, the Asian shrew, Suncus murinus and the Madagascan pygmy shrew, now considered a population of the widely distributed Etruscan shrew, Suncus etruscus, and likely to have been introduced to Madagascar from South or Southeast Asia by humans.

- Family: Soricidae (shrews)
  - Subfamily: Crocidurinae
    - Genus: Suncus
      - Etruscan shrew, S. etruscus - Madagascan pygmy shrew, S. e. madagascariensis LC
      - Asian house shrew, S. murinus

== Order: Chiroptera (bats) ==
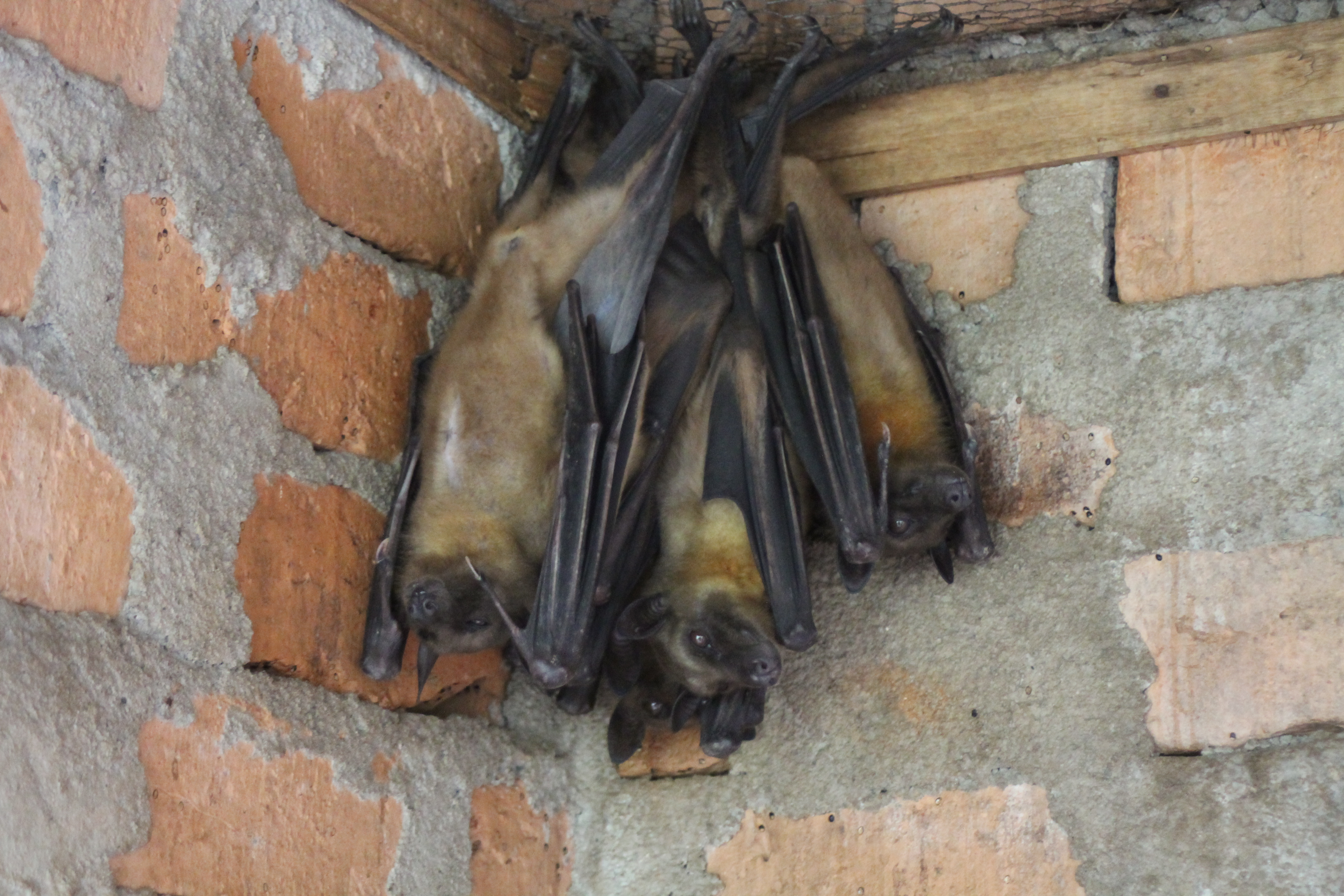
Madagascan fruit bat

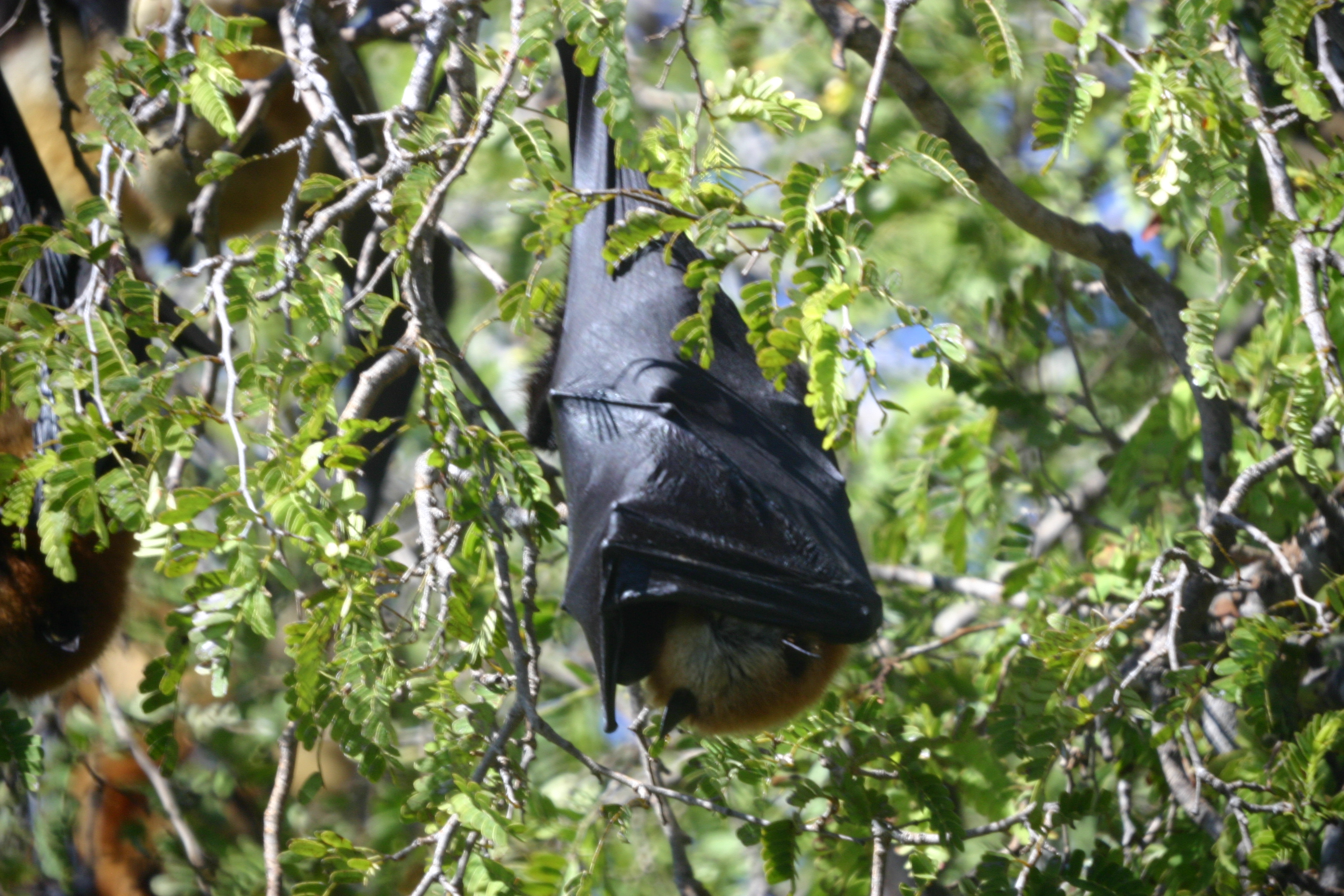
Madagascan flying fox

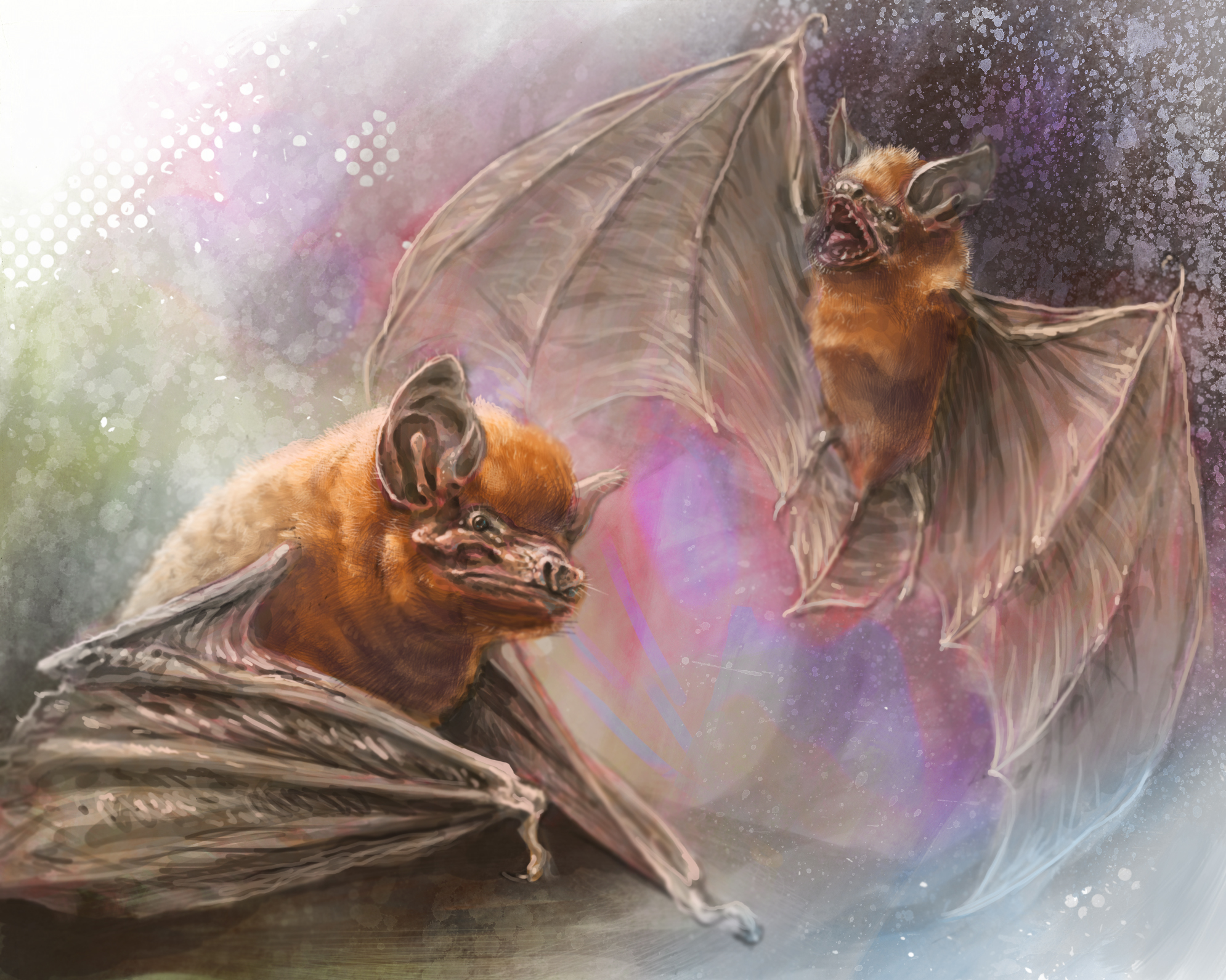
Manavi long-fingered bats

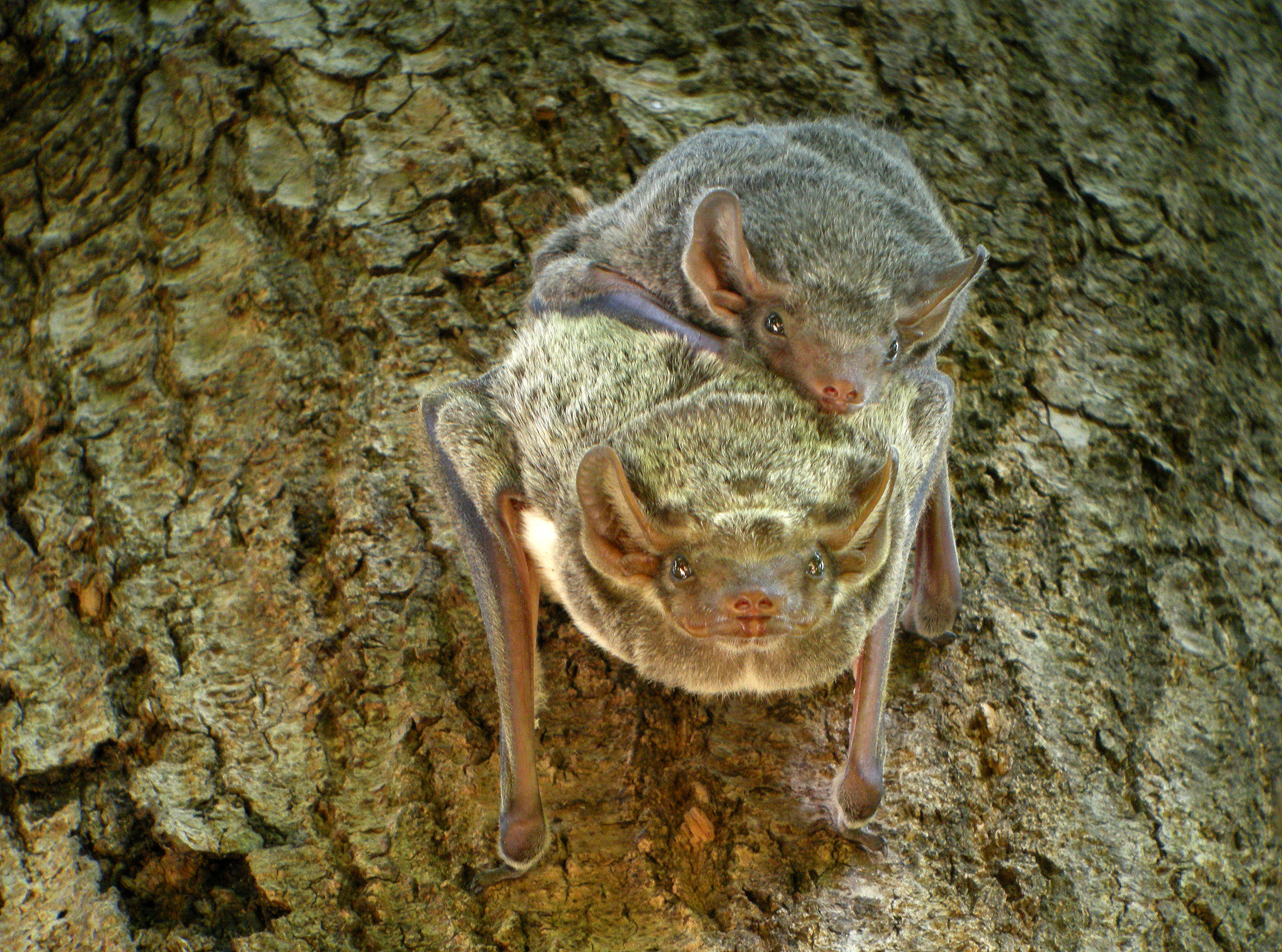
Mauritian tomb bat

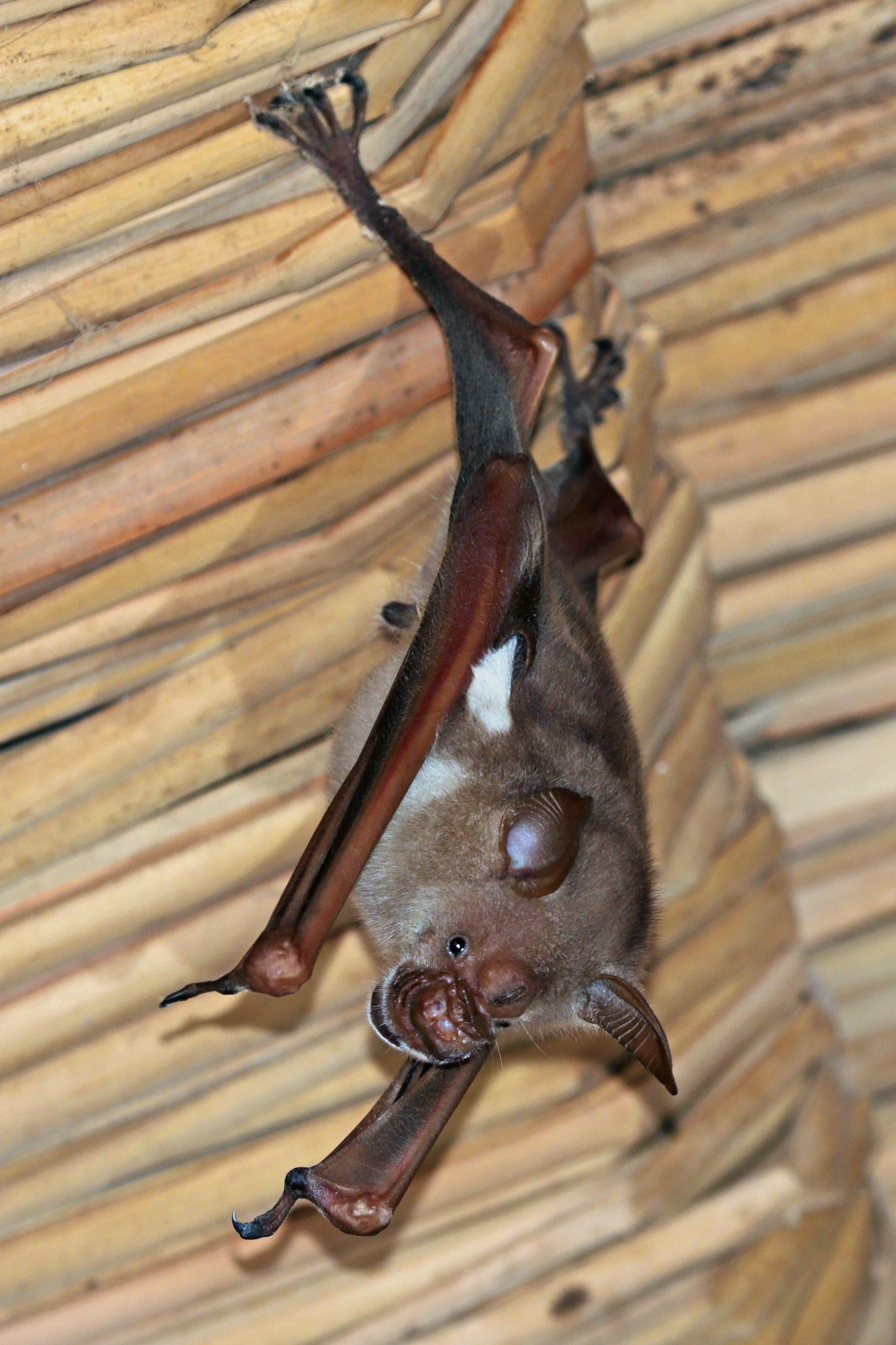
Commerson's roundleaf bat

The bats' most distinguishing feature is that their forelimbs are developed as wings, making them the only mammals capable of flight. Bat species account for about 20% of all mammals. Of the 46 species, 22 genera and 8 families of bats present on Madagascar, 36 species but only Myzopoda and Myzopodidae are endemic (the family was formerly present, however, on the African mainland). Paratriaenops is endemic to Madagascar plus the Seychelles.

- Family: Pteropodidae (flying foxes, Old World fruit bats)
  - Subfamily: Pteropodinae
    - Genus: Eidolon
      - Madagascan fruit bat, Eidolon dupreanum VU
    - Genus: Pteropus
      - Madagascan flying fox, Pteropus rufus VU
    - Genus: Rousettus
      - Madagascan rousette, Rousettus madagascariensis VU
- Family: Vespertilionidae
  - Subfamily: Myotinae
    - Genus: Myotis
      - Malagasy mouse-eared bat, Myotis goudoti LC
  - Subfamily: Vespertilioninae
    - Genus: Hypsugo
      - Anchieta's pipistrelle, Hypsugo anchietae LC
    - Genus: Neoromicia
      - Isalo serotine, Neoromicia malagasyensis VU
      - Malagasy serotine, Neoromicia matroka LC
      - Neoromicia robertsi DD
    - Genus: Pipistrellus
      - Dusky pipistrelle, Pipistrellus hesperidus LC
      - Racey's pipistrelle, Pipistrellus raceyi DD
    - Genus: Scotophilus
      - Lesser yellow bat, Scotophilus borbonicus DD
      - Marovaza house bat, Scotophilus marovaza LC
      - Robust yellow bat, Scotophilus robustus LC
      - Western yellow bat, Scotophilus tandrefana DD
- Family: Miniopteridae
  - Genus: Miniopterus
    - Miniopterus aelleni LC
    - Miniopterus brachytragos LC
    - Eger's long-fingered bat, Miniopterus egeri LC
    - Glen's long-fingered bat, Miniopterus gleni LC
    - Griffith's long-fingered bat, Miniopterus griffithsi DD
    - Miniopterus griveaudi DD
    - Miniopterus mahafaliensis LC
    - Major's long-fingered bat, Miniopterus majori LC
    - Manavi long-fingered bat, Miniopterus manavi LC
    - Peterson's long-fingered bat, Miniopterus petersoni DD
    - Sororcula long-fingered bat, Miniopterus sororculus LC
- Family: Molossidae
  - Genus: Chaerephon
    - Chaerephon atsinanana LC
    - Black and red free-tailed bat, Chaerephon jobimena LC
    - Grandidier's free-tailed bat, Chaerephon leucogaster LC
  - Genus: Mops
    - Malagasy white-bellied free-tailed bat, Mops leucostigma LC
    - Midas free-tailed bat, Mops midas LC
  - Genus: Mormopterus
    - Peter's wrinkle-lipped bat, Mormopterus jugularis LC
  - Genus: Otomops
    - Madagascar free-tailed bat, Otomops madagascariensis LC
  - Genus: Tadarida
    - Madagascan large free-tailed bat, Tadarida fulminans LC
- Family: Emballonuridae
  - Genus: Coleura
    - African sheath-tailed bat, Coleura afra LC
  - Genus: Emballonura
    - Peters's sheath-tailed bat, Emballonura atrata LC
  - Genus: Paremballonura
    - Western sheath-tailed bat, Paremballonura tiavato LC
  - Genus: Taphozous
    - Mauritian tomb bat, Taphozous mauritianus LC
- Family: Nycteridae
  - Genus: Nycteris
    - Malagasy slit-faced bat, Nycteris madagascariensis DD
- Family: Hipposideridae
  - Genus: Hipposideros
  - Genus: Macronycteris
    - Commerson's roundleaf bat, Macronycteris commersoni NT
    - Macronycteris cryptovalorona DD
  - Genus: Paratriaenops
    - Grandidier's trident bat, Paratriaenops auritus VU
    - Trouessart's trident bat, Paratriaenops furcula LC
  - Genus: Triaenops
    - Triaenops menamena LC
- Family: Myzopodidae
  - Genus: Myzopoda
    - Madagascar sucker-footed bat, Myzopoda aurita LC
    - Western sucker-footed bat, Myzopoda schliemanni LC

== Order: Carnivora (carnivorans) ==
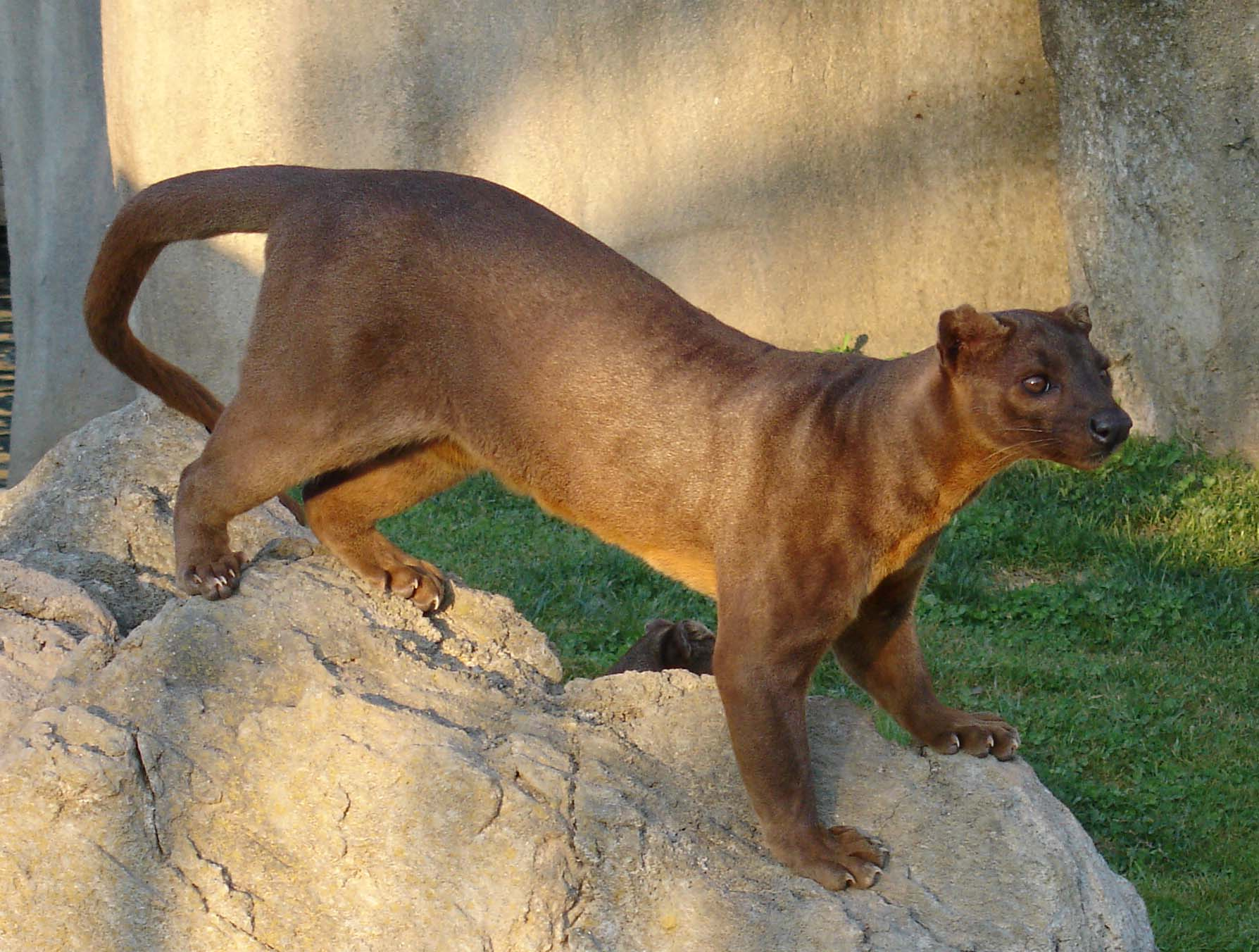
Fossa

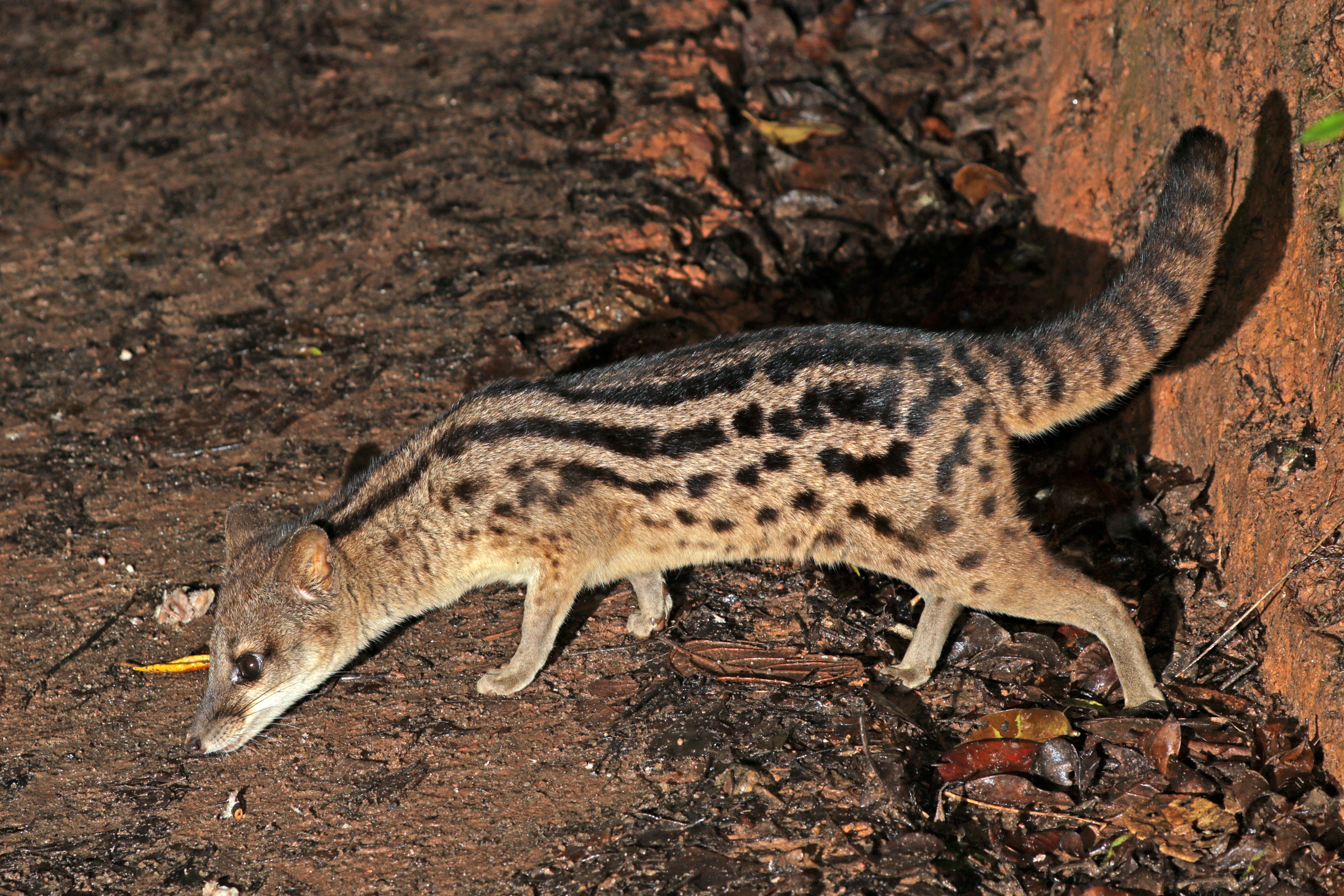
Malagasy civet

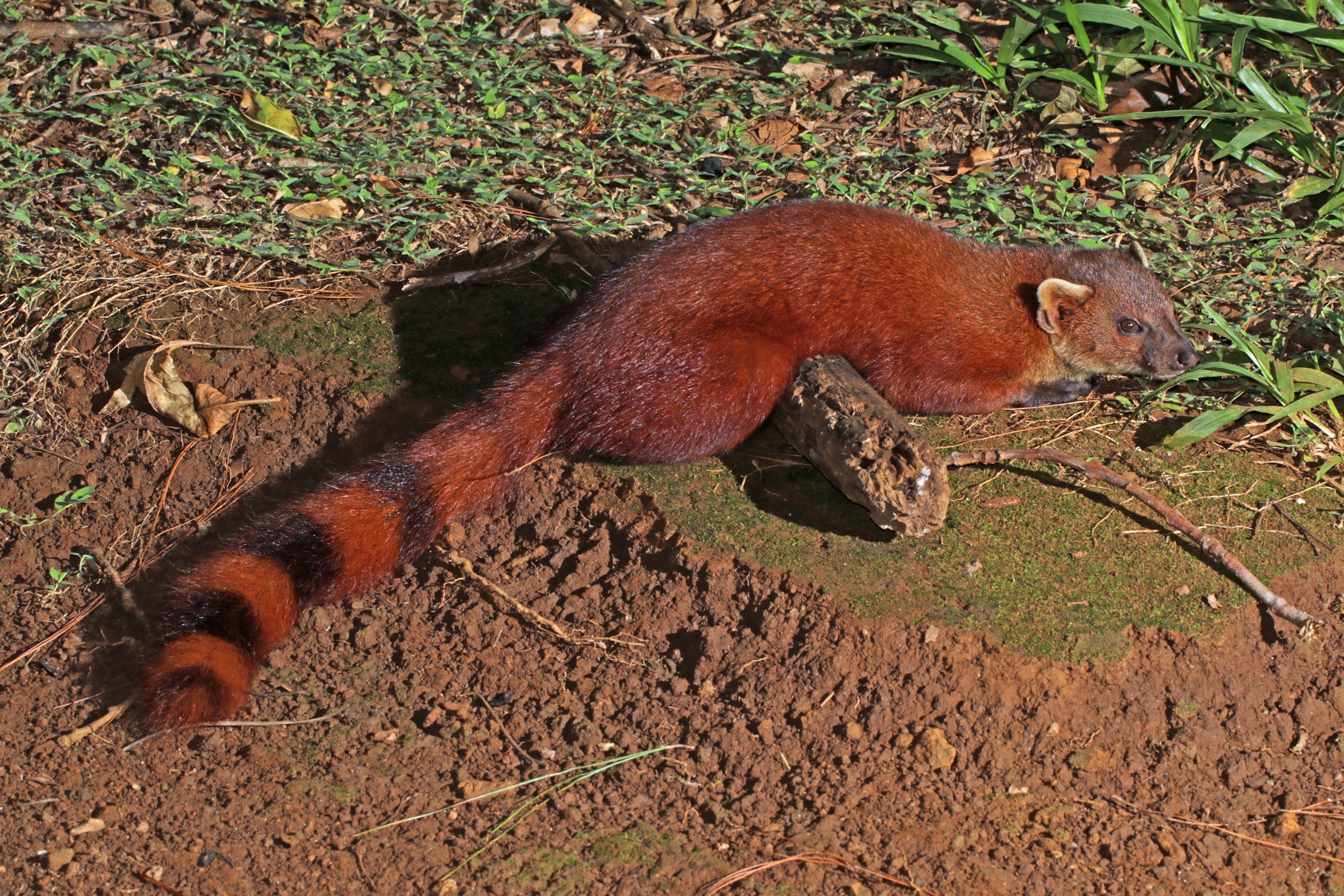
Ring-tailed vontsira

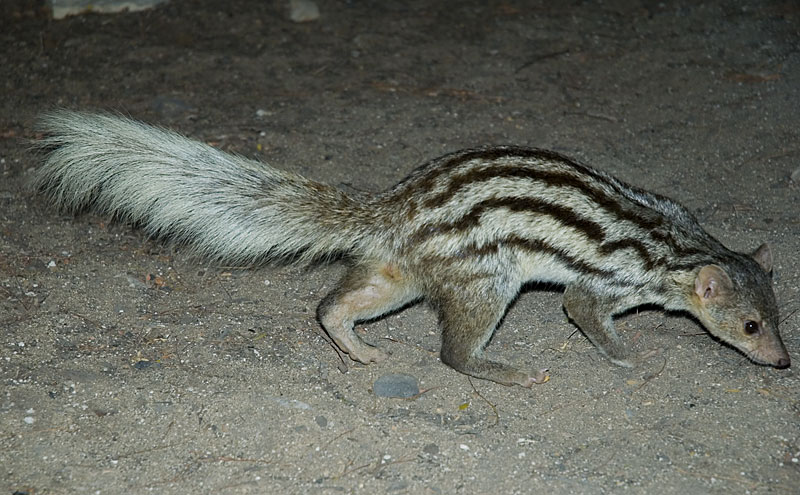
Grandidier's vontsira

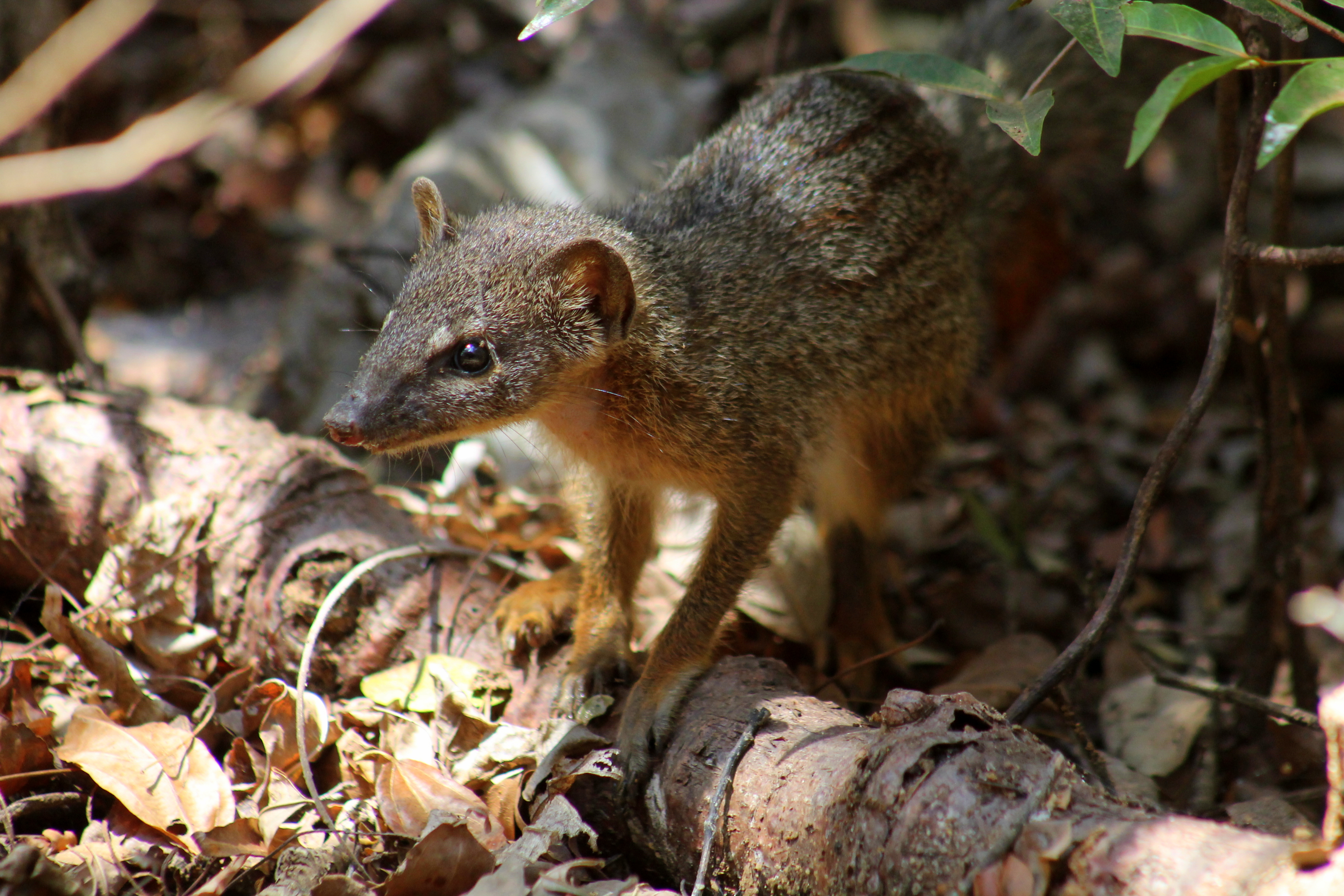
Narrow-striped mongoose

There are over 260 species of carnivorans, the majority of which feed primarily on meat. They have a characteristic skull shape and dentition. The native terrestrial carnivorans of Madagascar are all euplerids, which are believed to descend from a common ancestor that rafted over from Africa 19–26 million years ago. Their closest relatives are the herpestids, the African and Eurasian mongooses. Malagasy mongooses are not "true" mongooses but rather are thought to represent an example of convergent or parallel evolution. About 30% of African terrestrial carnivoran species are herpestids.

- Suborder: Feliformia
  - Family: Eupleridae
    - Subfamily: Euplerinae
      - Genus: Cryptoprocta
        - Fossa, Cryptoprocta ferox VU
      - Genus: Eupleres
        - Eastern falanouc, Eupleres goudotii VU
        - Western falanouc, Eupleres major EN
      - Genus: Fossa
        - Malagasy civet, Fossa fossana VU
    - Subfamily: Galidiinae
      - Genus: Galidia
        - Ring-tailed vontsira, Galidia elegans LC
      - Genus: Galidictis
        - Broad-striped Malagasy mongoose, Galidictis fasciata VU
        - Grandidier's vontsira, Galidictis grandidieri EN
      - Genus: Mungotictis
        - Narrow-striped mongoose, Mungotictis decemlineata EN
      - Genus: Salanoia
        - Brown-tailed mongoose, Salanoia concolor VU
        - Durrell's vontsira, Salanoia durrelli NE
- Suborder: Caniformia
  - Clade Pinnipedia (seals, sea lions and walruses)
    - Family: Otariidae (eared seals, sealions)
      - Genus: Arctophoca
        - Subantarctic fur seal, Arctophoca tropicalis LC

== Order: Artiodactyla (even-toed ungulates and cetaceans) ==
- Family: Suidae (suids)
  - Genus: Potamochoerus
    - Bushpig, Potamochoerus larvatus LC introduced

== Order: Cetacea (whales, dolphins and porpoises) ==
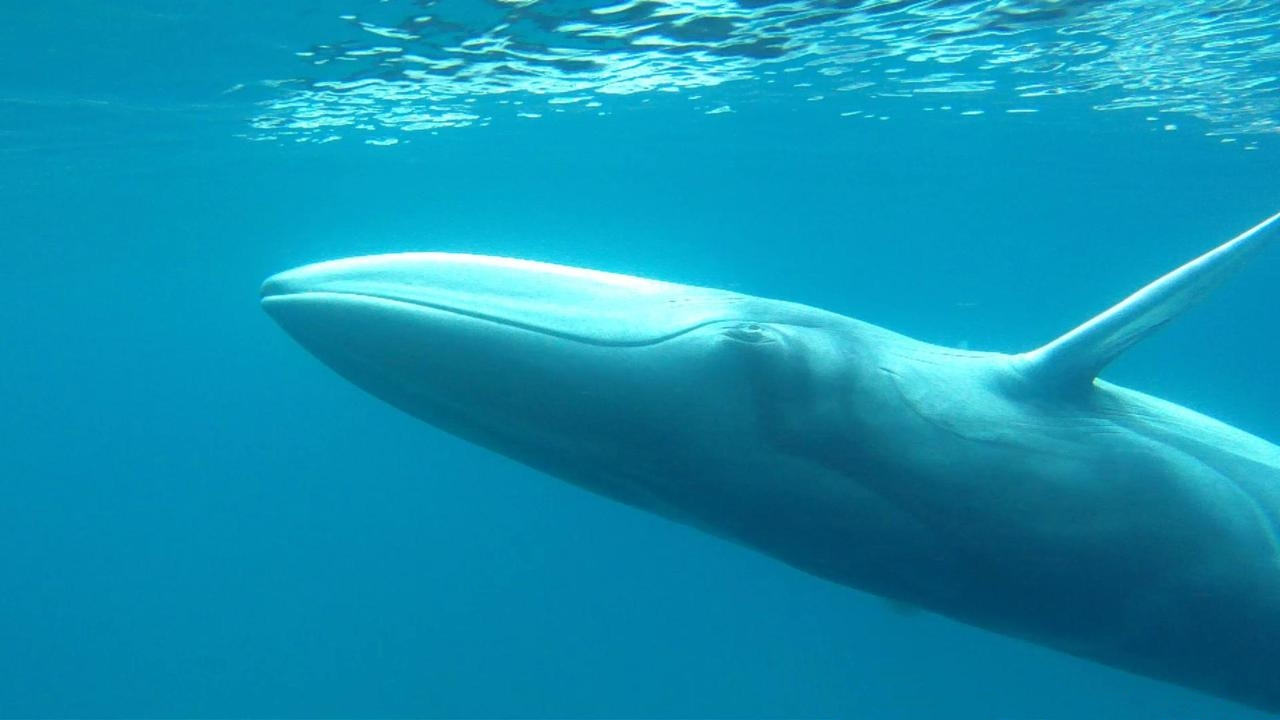
Omura's whale off Nosy Be

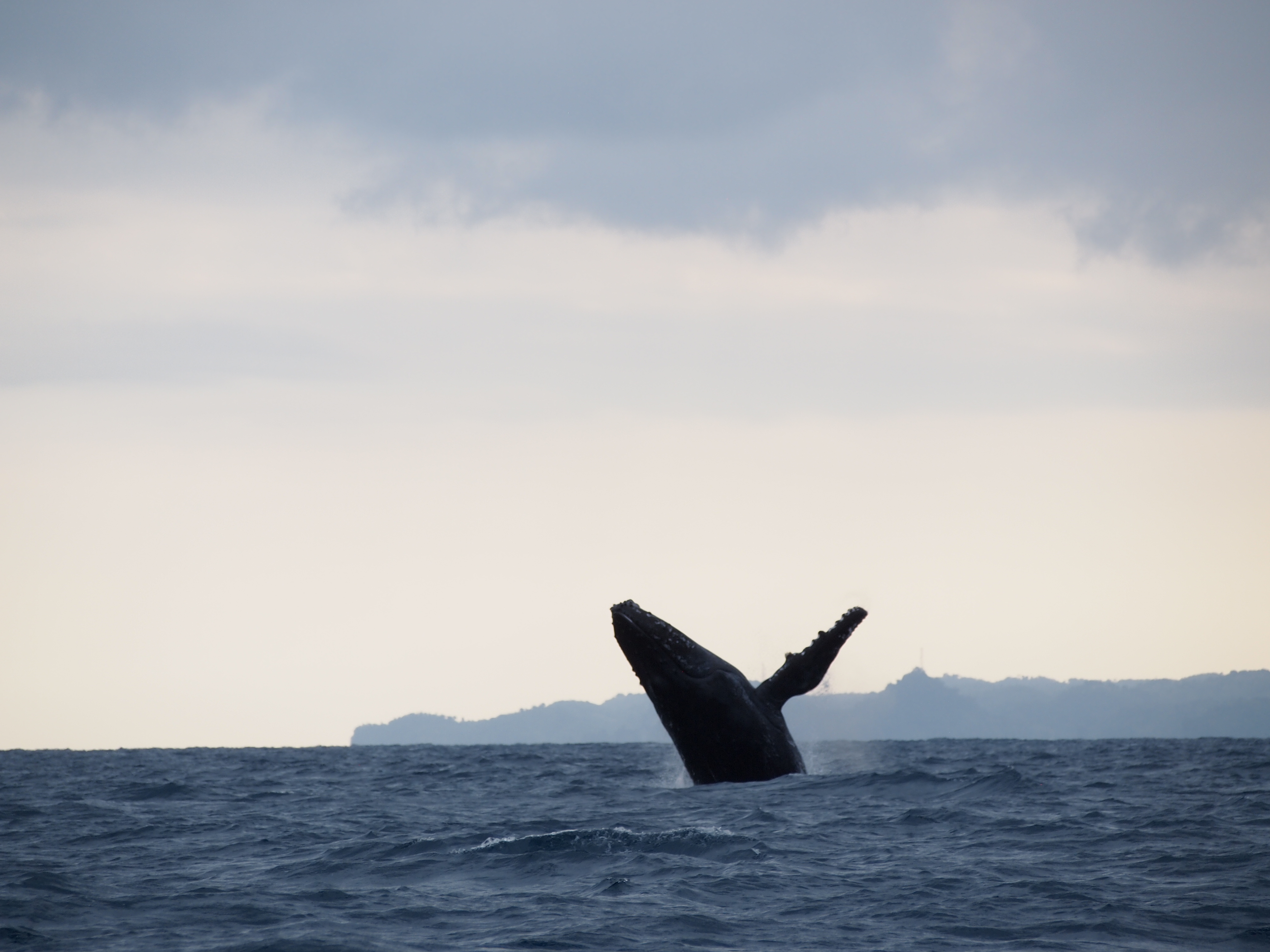
Humpback whale off Île Sainte-Marie

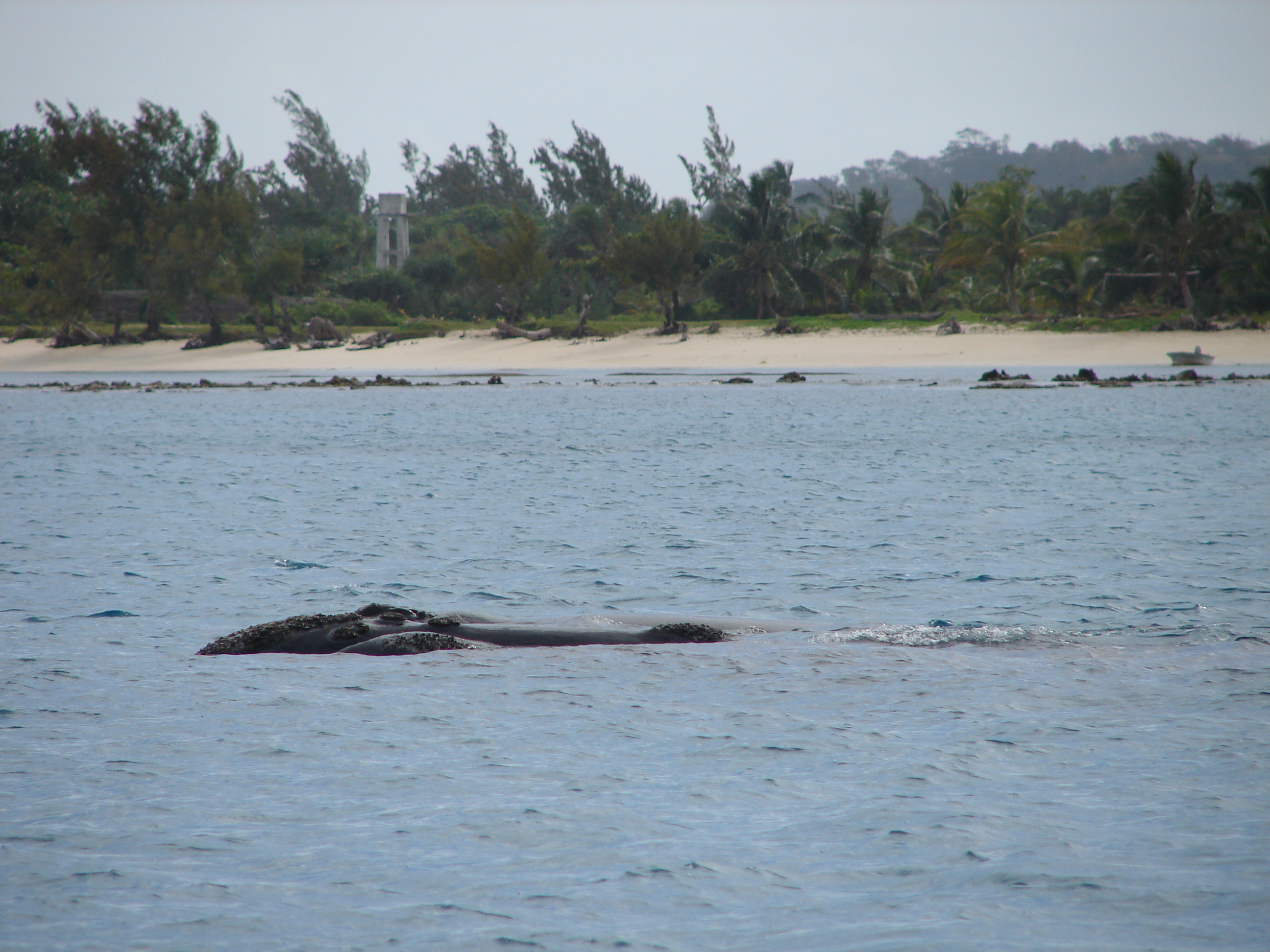
Southern right whale, Île Sainte-Marie

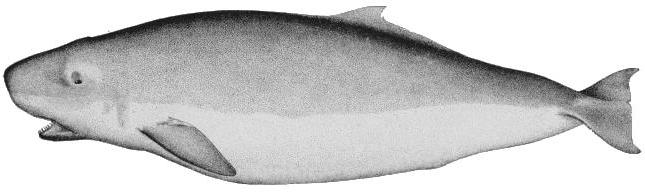
Pygmy sperm whale

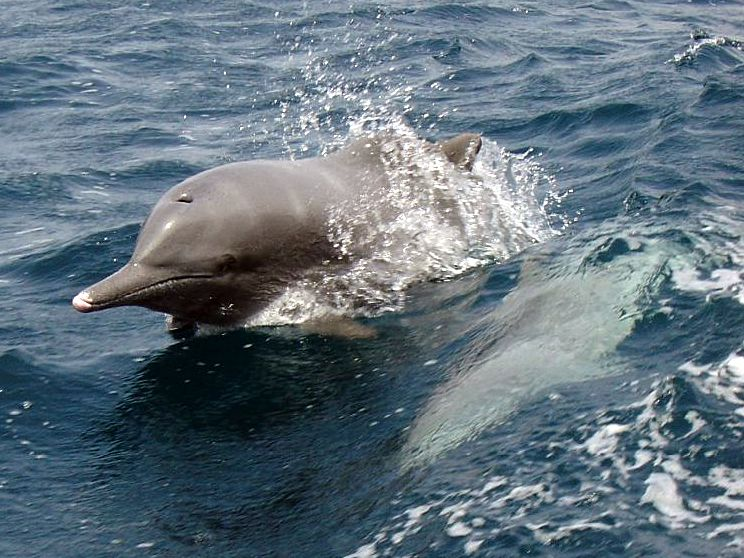
Indian Ocean humpback dolphin

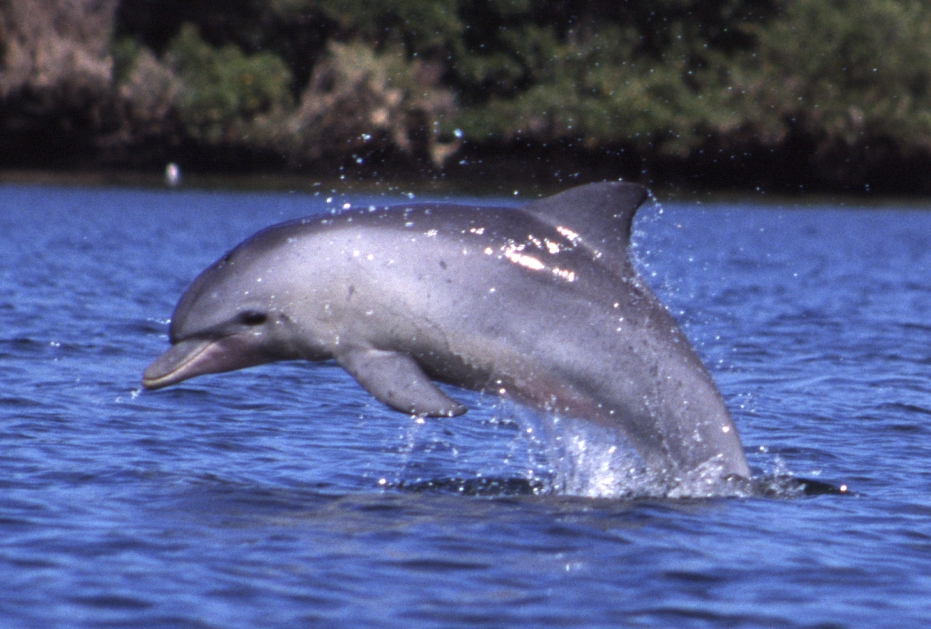
Indo-Pacific bottlenose dolphin

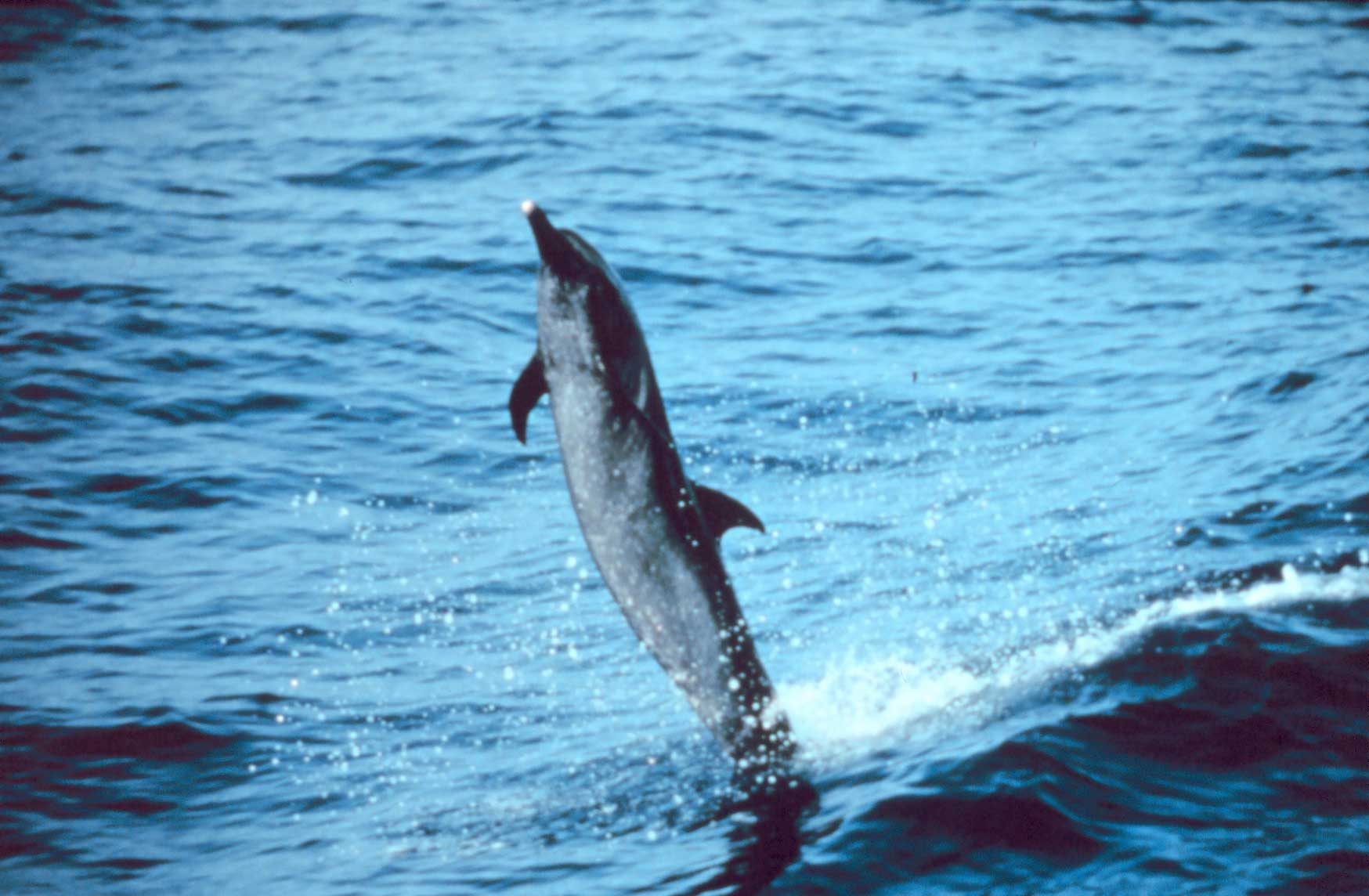
Pantropical spotted dolphin

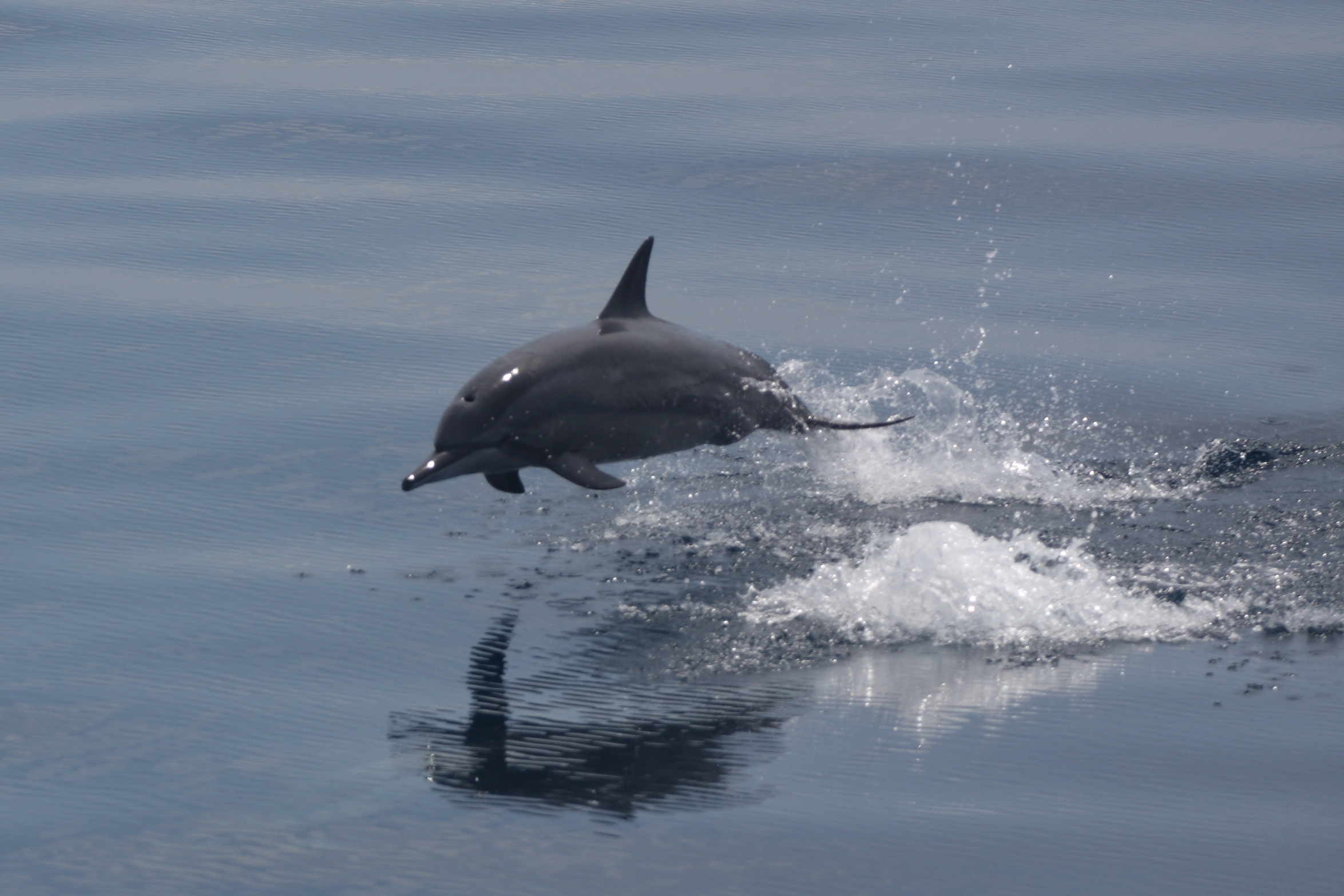
Spinner dolphin

Fraser's dolphins

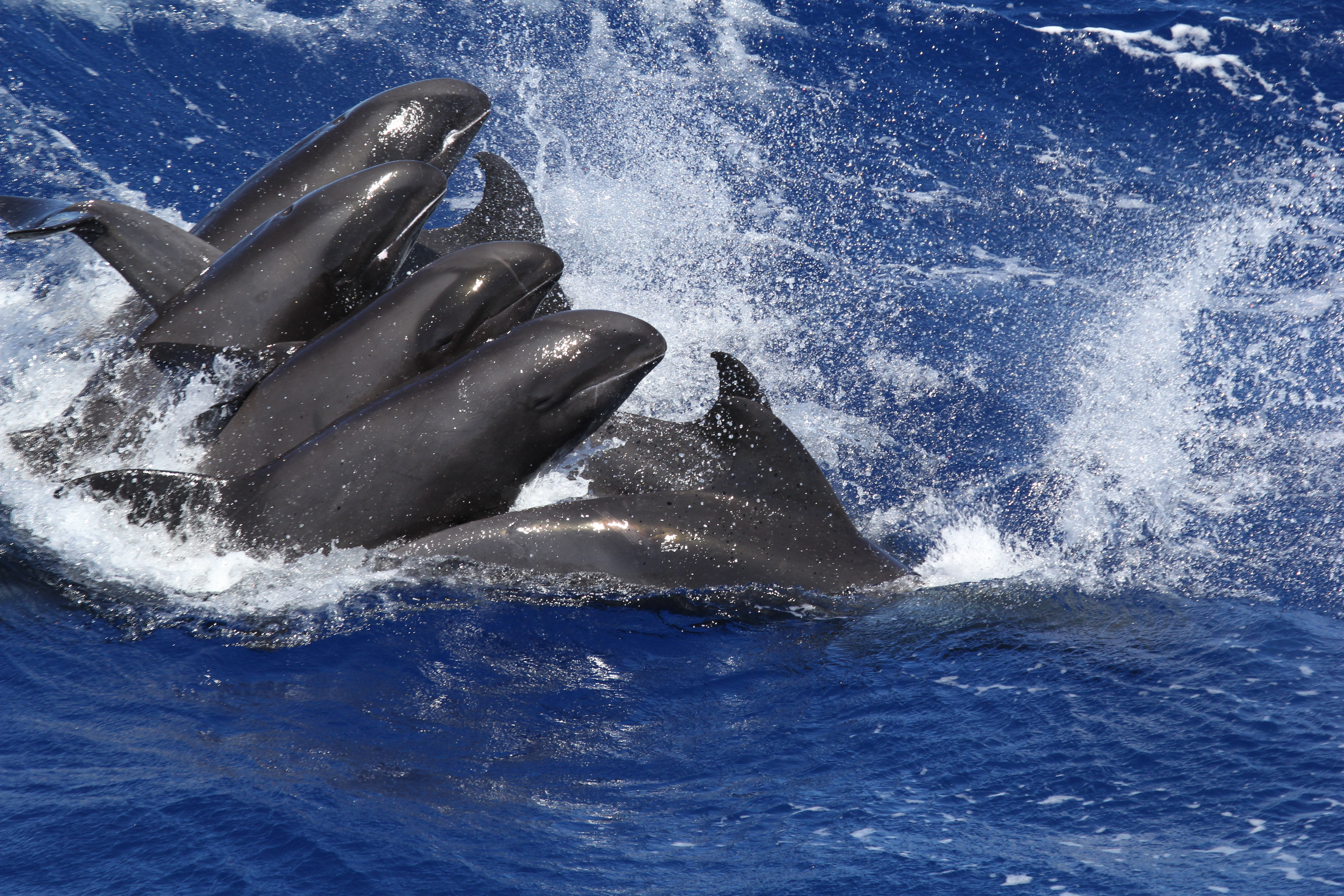
Melon-headed whales

The infraorder Cetacea includes whales, dolphins and porpoises. They are the mammals most fully adapted to aquatic life with a spindle-shaped nearly hairless body, protected by a thick layer of blubber, and forelimbs and tail modified to provide propulsion underwater. Their closest extant relatives are the hippos, which are artiodactyls, from which cetaceans descended; cetaceans are thus also artiodactyls.

- Parvorder: Mysticeti
  - Family: Balaenopteridae
    - Subfamily: Balaenopterinae
      - Genus: Balaenoptera
        - Common minke whale, Balaenoptera acutorostrata LC
        - Antarctic minke whale, Balaenoptera bonaerensis DD
        - Sei whale, Balaenoptera borealis EN
          - Southern sei whale, B. b. schlegelii
        - Bryde's whale, Balaenoptera edeni DD
        - Pygmy blue whale, Balaenoptera musculus brevicauda DD
        - Southern blue whale, Balaenoptera musculus EN
          - Southern blue whale, B. m. intermedia
        - Omura's whale, Balaenoptera omurai DD
        - Fin whale, Balaenoptera physalus EN
          - Southern fin whale, B. p. quoyi
    - Subfamily: Megapterinae
      - Genus: Megaptera
        - Humpback whale, Megaptera novaeangliae LC
  - Family: Cetotheriidae
    - Subfamily: Neobalaeninae
      - Genus: Caperea
        - Pygmy right whale, Caperea marginata LC
  - Family: Balaenidae
    - Genus: Eubalaena
      - Southern right whale, Eubalaena australis LC
- Parvorder: Odontoceti
  - Family: Physeteridae
    - Genus: Physeter
      - Sperm whale, Physeter macrocephalus VU
  - Family: Kogiidae
    - Genus: Kogia
      - Pygmy sperm whale, Kogia breviceps DD
      - Dwarf sperm whale, Kogia sima DD
  - Family: Ziphidae
    - Genus: Indopacetus
      - Tropical bottlenose whale, Indopacetus pacificus DD
    - Genus: Ziphius
      - Cuvier's beaked whale, Ziphius cavirostris LC
    - Subfamily: Hyperoodontinae
      - Genus: Mesoplodon
        - Blainville's beaked whale, Mesoplodon densirostris DD
        - Gray's beaked whale, Mesoplodon grayi DD
        - Hector's beaked whale, Mesoplodon hectori DD
        - Layard's beaked whale, Mesoplodon layardii DD
        - True's beaked whale, Mesoplodon mirus DD
  - Superfamily: Delphinoidea
    - Family: Delphinidae (marine dolphins)
      - Genus: Steno
        - Rough-toothed dolphin, Steno bredanensis LC
      - Genus: Grampus
        - Risso's dolphin, Grampus griseus LC
      - Genus: Globicephala
        - Short-finned pilot whale, Globicephala macrorhynchus LC
      - Genus: Sousa
        - Indian Ocean humpback dolphin, Sousa plumbea EN
      - Genus: Tursiops
        - Indo-Pacific bottlenose dolphin, Tursiops aduncus NT
        - Common bottlenose dolphin, Tursiops truncatus LC
      - Genus: Stenella
        - Pantropical spotted dolphin, Stenella attenuata LC
        - Striped dolphin, Stenella coeruleoalba LC
        - Spinner dolphin, Stenella longirostris LC
      - Genus: Delphinus
        - Long-beaked common dolphin, Delphinus capensis DD
      - Genus: Lagenodelphis
        - Fraser's dolphin, Lagenodelphis hosei LC
      - Genus: Peponocephala
        - Melon-headed whale, Peponocephala electra LC
      - Genus: Pseudorca
        - False killer whale, Pseudorca crassidens NT
      - Genus: Feresa
        - Pygmy killer whale, Feresa attenuata LC
      - Genus: Orcinus
        - Orca, Orcinus orca DD

== Globally extinct ==
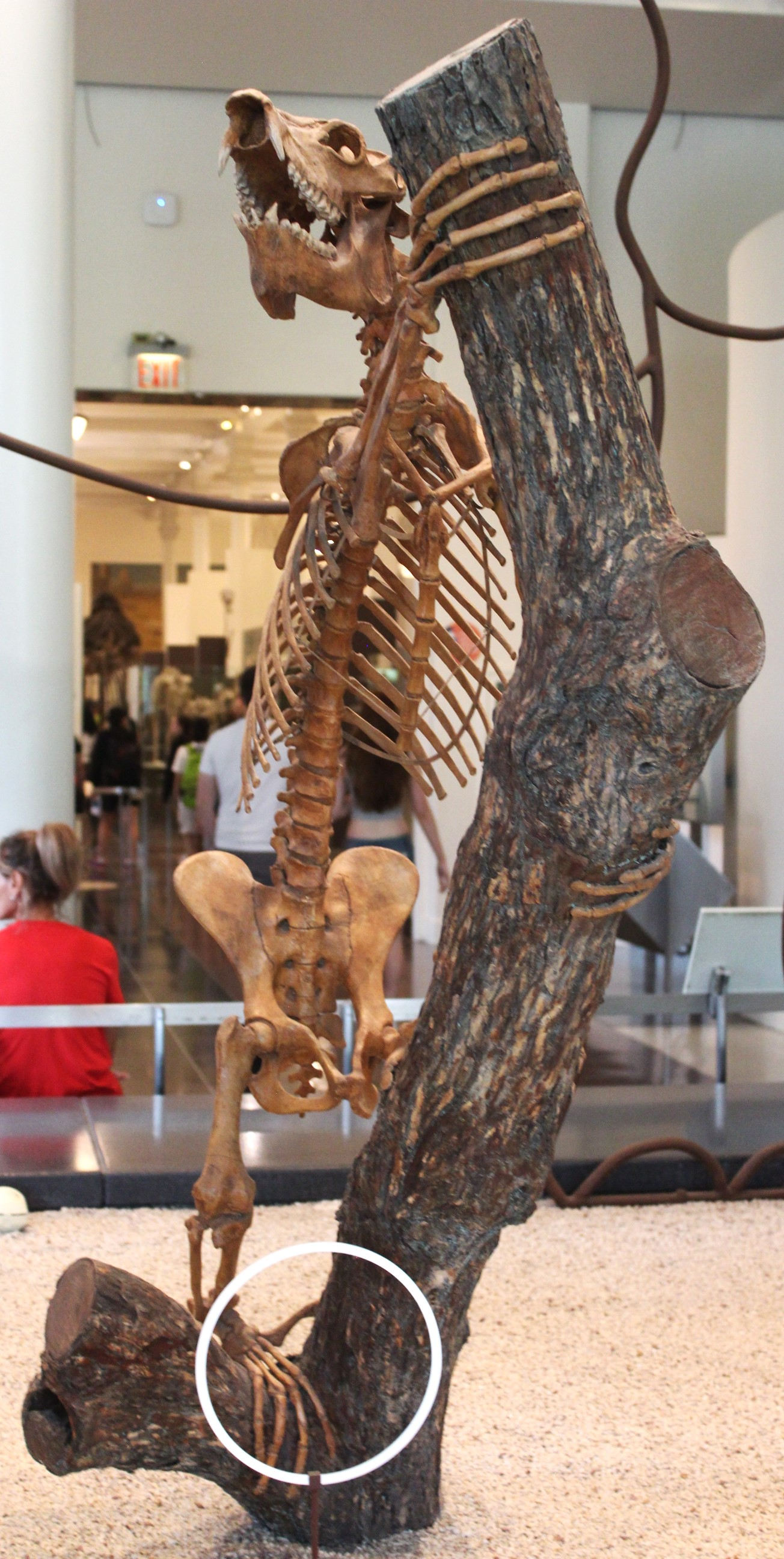
Mounted skeleton of Megaladapis edwardsi

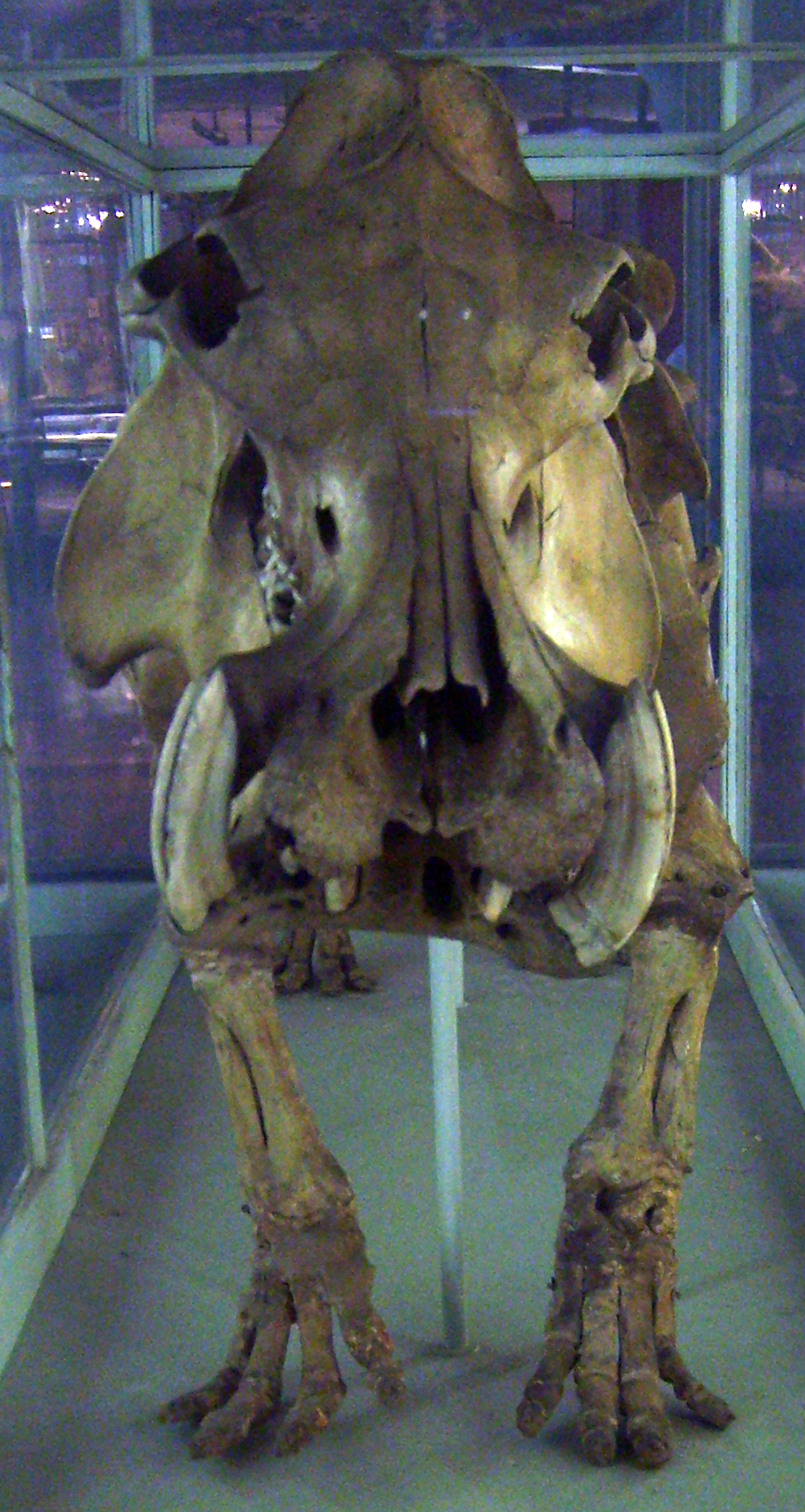
Mounted skeleton of Hippopotamus lemerlei

The following species are globally extinct:

- "Subfossil/giant lemurs"
  - Archaeoindris fontoynonti EX (c. 350 BC)
  - Archaeolemur edwardsi EX (c. 1047 - 1280 AD)
  - Archaeolemur majori EX (c. 1047 - 1280 AD)
  - Giant aye aye, Daubentonia robusta EX (c. 1000 AD)
  - Pachylemur insignis EX (c. 680 - 960 AD)
  - Pachylemur jullyi EX (c. 680 - 960 AD)
  - Megaladapis edwardsi EX (c. 1280 - 1420 AD)
  - Megaladapis madagascariensis EX (c. 1280 - 1420 AD)
  - Megaladapis grandidieri EX (c. 1280 - 1420 AD)
  - Hadropithecus stenognathus EX (c. 444 - 772 AD)
  - Babakotia radofilai EX (c. 1000 AD)
  - Mesopropithecus dolichobrachion EX (570 - 679 AD)
  - Mesopropithecus globiceps EX (570 - 679 AD)
  - Mesopropithecus pithecoides EX (570 - 679 AD)
  - Palaeopropithecus ingens EX (1620)
  - Palaeopropithecus maximus EX (PH)
  - Palaeopropithecus kelyus EX (PH)
- Plesiorycteropus germainepetterae EX (c. 1000 AD)
- Plesiorycteropus madagascariensis EX (c. 1000 AD)
- Microgale macpheei EX (PH)
- Hypogeomys australis EX (c. 1536 BP)
- Giant fossa, Cryptoprocta spelea EX (pre-1658)
- Malagasy hippopotamus
  - Lesser Malagasy hippopotamus, Hippopotamus laloumena EX (possibly c. 1800 AD) (Note: A skull belonging to one of the three species was dated to be less than 200 years old)
  - Malagasy dwarf hippopotamus, Hippopotamus lemerlei EX (possibly c. 1800 AD)
  - Malagasy pygmy hippopotamus, Hippopotamus madagascariensis EX (possibly c. 1800 AD)

== See also ==
- Fauna of Madagascar
- Wildlife of Madagascar
- Mesozoic mammals of Madagascar
- List of Madagascar and Indian Ocean Island animals extinct in the Holocene
- Lists of mammals by region
- List of prehistoric mammals
- Mammal classification
- List of mammals described in the 2000s
- List of invasive species in Madagascar
