= List of nesomyids =

Species in mammal family Nesomyidae

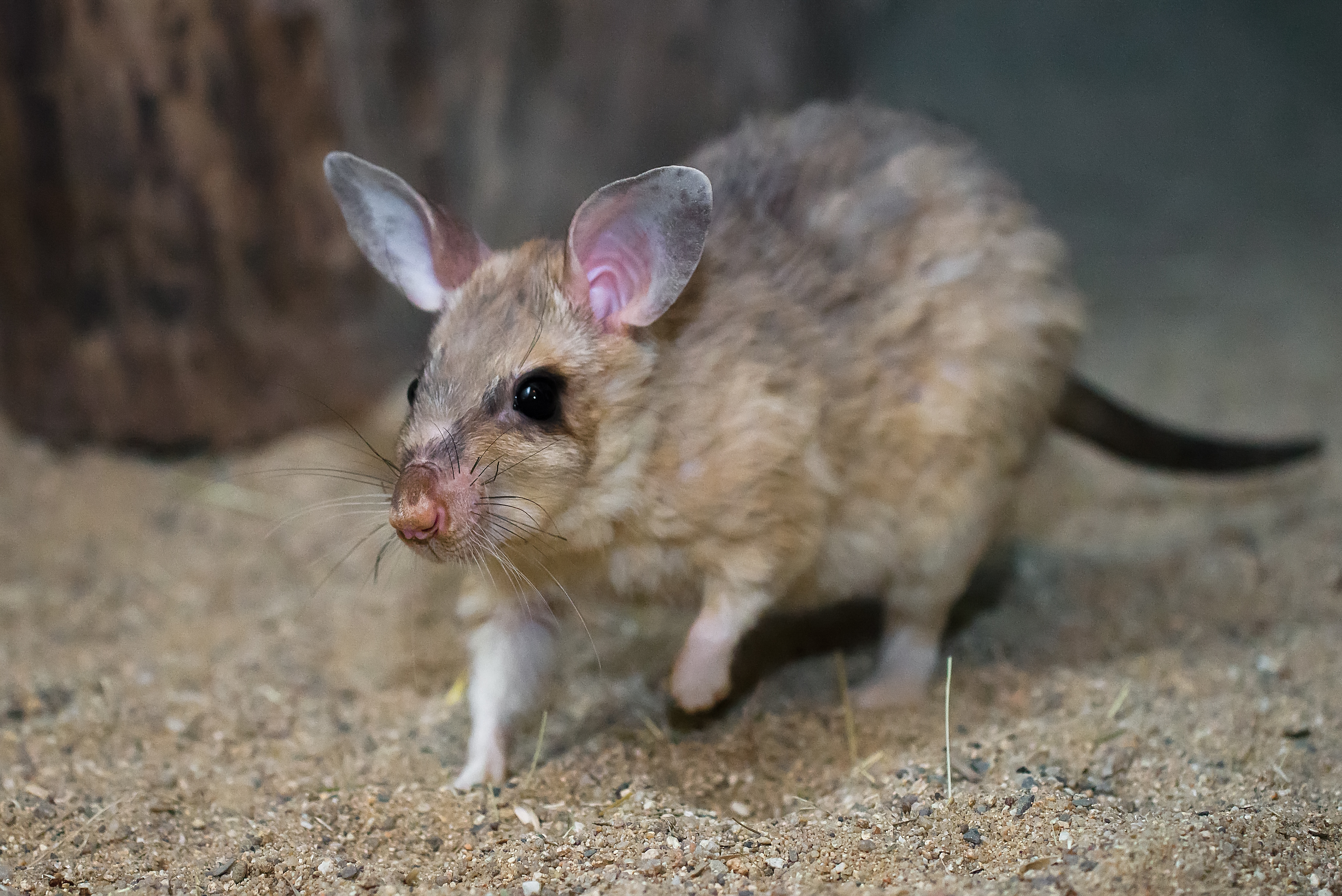
Malagasy giant rat (Hypogeomys antimena)

Nesomyidae is a family of mammals in the order Rodentia and part of the Myomorpha suborder. Members of this family are called nesomyids, and include Malagasy rodents, climbing mice, African rock mice, pouched rats, and tufted-tailed rats. They are found in sub-Saharan Africa, primarily in forests, savannas, shrublands, grasslands, and deserts, though some species can be found in rocky areas. They range in size from Monard's African climbing mouse, at 4 cm (2 in) plus a 5 cm (2 in) tail, to the southern giant pouched rat, at 41 cm (16 in) plus a 45 cm (18 in) tail. Nesomyids are generally omnivores, and eat seeds, fruit, nuts, roots, stems, and insects. Few nesomyids have population estimates, but five species—the white-tipped tufted-tailed rat, greater big-footed mouse, western nesomys, eastern voalavo, and Petter's tufted-tailed rat—are categorized as endangered, while the Mount Kahuzi climbing mouse and Malagasy giant rat are categorized as critically endangered.

The 67 extant species of Nesomyidae are divided into 21 genera, divided into 6 subfamilies. Cricetomyinae contains 8 species of hamster-rats and pouched rats in 3 genera, Delanymyinae contains a single species, Dendromurinae contains 26 species of climbing mice and fat mice in 6 genera, Mystromyinae contains a single species, Nesomyinae contains 27 species of short-tailed rats, tufted-tailed rats, and big-footed mice in 9 genera, and Petromyscinae contains 4 species of rock mice in a single genus. Several extinct prehistoric nesomyid species have been discovered, though due to ongoing research and discoveries, the exact number and categorization is not fixed.

== Conventions ==
IUCN Red List categories
Conservation status
- EX: Extinct (0 species)
- EW: Extinct in the wild (0 species)
- CR: Critically endangered (2 species)
- EN: Endangered (5 species)
- VU: Vulnerable (5 species)
- NT: Near threatened (0 species)
- LC: Least concern (44 species)

Other categories
- DD: Data deficient (8 species)
- NE: Not evaluated (3 species)

The author citation for the species or genus is given after the scientific name; parentheses around the author citation indicate that this was not the original taxonomic placement. Conservation status codes listed follow the International Union for Conservation of Nature (IUCN) Red List of Threatened Species. Range maps are provided wherever possible; if a range map is not available, a description of the nesomyid's range is provided. Ranges are based on the IUCN Red List for that species unless otherwise noted.

== Classification ==
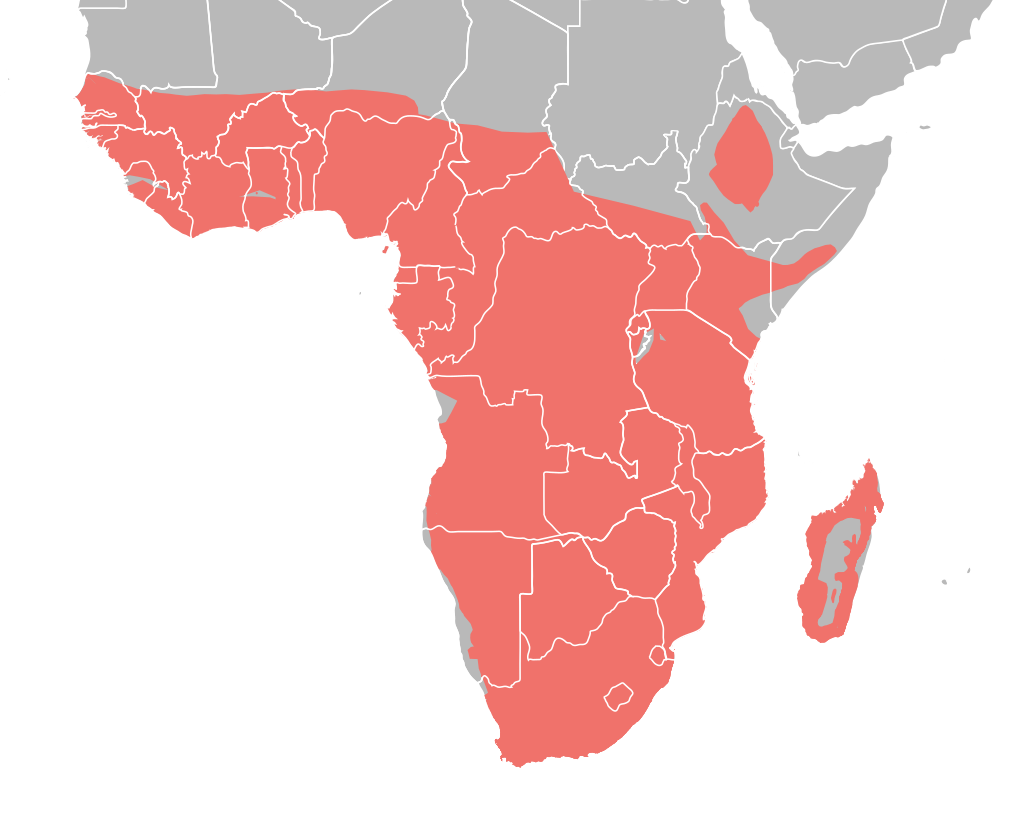
Nesomyidae distribution

Nesomyidae is a family consisting of 67 extant species in 21 genera. These genera are divided into six subfamilies: Cricetomyinae, containing 8 species of in 3 genera; Delanymyinae, containing a single species; Dendromurinae, containing 26 species in 6 genera; Mystromyinae, containing a single species; Nesomyinae, containing 27 species in 9 genera; and Petromyscinae, containing 4 species in a single genus. This does not include hybrid species or extinct prehistoric species.

Family Nesomyidae

- Subfamily Cricetomyinae
  - Genus Beamys (hamster-rats): two species
  - Genus Cricetomys (pouched rats): four species
  - Genus Saccostomus (pouched mice): one species
- Subfamily Delanymyinae
  - Genus Delanymys (Delany's mouse): one species
- Subfamily Dendromurinae
  - Genus Dendromus (climbing mice): fourteen species
  - Genus Dendroprionomys (velvet climbing mouse): one species
  - Genus Malacothrix (gerbil mouse): one species
  - Genus Megadendromus (Nikolaus's mouse): one species
  - Genus Prionomys (Dollman's tree mouse): one species
  - Genus Steatomys (fat mice): eight species
- Subfamily Mystromyinae
  - Genus Mystromys (white-tailed rat): one species
- Subfamily Nesomyinae
  - Genus Brachytarsomys (antsangies): two species
  - Genus Brachyuromys (short-tailed rats): two species
  - Genus Eliurus (tufted-tailed rats): twelve species
  - Genus Gymnuromys (voalavoanala): one species
  - Genus Hypogeomys (Malagasy giant rat): one species
  - Genus Macrotarsomys (big-footed mice): three species
  - Genus Monticolomys (Malagasy mountain mouse): one species
  - Genus Nesomys (red forest rats): three species
  - Genus Voalavo (voalavos): two species
- Subfamily Petromyscinae
  - Genus Petromyscus (rock mice): four species

- Nesomyidae
  - - Nesomyinae
      - - Brachytarsomys
        - - Gymnuromys
          - - Eliurus
            - Voalavo
      - - - - Brachyuromys
            - Nesomys
          - Hypogeomys
        - - Macrotarsomys
          - Monticolomys
  - - - Cricetomyinae
        - - Beamys
          - Cricetomys
        - Saccostomus
      - Dendromurinae
        - - Dendromus
          - Malacothrix
        - Steatomys
        - Dendroprionomys
        - Megadendromus
        - Prionomys
    - - - Mystromyinae
          Mystromys
        - Petromyscinae
          Petromyscus
      - - Delanymyinae
          Delanymys

== Nesomyids ==
The following classification is based on the taxonomy described by the reference work Mammal Species of the World (2005), with augmentation by generally accepted proposals made since using molecular phylogenetic analysis, as supported by both the IUCN and the American Society of Mammalogists.

=== Subfamily Cricetomyinae ===
Genus Beamys – Thomas, 1909 – two species
Common name	Scientific name and subspecies	Range	Size and ecology	IUCN status and estimated population
Greater hamster-rat	B. major Dollman, 1914	Southeastern Africa	Size: 13–18 cm (5–7 in) long, plus 12–15 cm (5–6 in) tail Habitat: Forest Diet: Seeds and fruit	NE Unknown
Lesser hamster-rat	B. hindei Thomas, 1909	Southeastern Africa	Size: 12–16 cm (5–6 in) long, plus 11–13 cm (4–5 in) tail Habitat: Forest Diet: Seeds and fruit	LC Unknown

Genus Cricetomys – Waterhouse, 1840 – four species
Common name	Scientific name and subspecies	Range	Size and ecology	IUCN status and estimated population
Emin's pouched rat	C. emini Wroughton, 1910	Central and western Africa	Size: 30–35 cm (12–14 in) long, plus 32–43 cm (13–17 in) tail Habitat: Forest Diet: Omnivorous, including fruit and nuts as well as vegetables, insects, crabs, and snails	LC Unknown
Gambian pouched rat	C. gambianus Waterhouse, 1840	Central and western Africa	Size: 28–39 cm (11–15 in) long, plus 25–40 cm (10–16 in) tail Habitat: Forest and savanna Diet: Omnivorous, including fruit and nuts as well as vegetables, insects, crabs, and snails	LC Unknown
Kivu giant pouched rat	C. kivuensis Lönnberg, 1917	Central and western Africa	Size: About 32 cm (13 in) long, plus about 34 cm (13 in) tail Habitat: Forest Diet: Omnivorous, including fruit and nuts as well as vegetables, insects, crabs, and snails	NE Unknown
Southern giant pouched rat	C. ansorgei Thomas, 1904	Central and southern Africa	Size: 29–41 cm (11–16 in) long, plus 34–45 cm (13–18 in) tail Habitat: Forest and savanna Diet: Omnivorous, including fruit and nuts as well as vegetables, insects, crabs, and snails	LC Unknown

Genus Saccostomus – Peters, 1846 – two species
Common name	Scientific name and subspecies	Range	Size and ecology	IUCN status and estimated population
Mearns's pouched mouse	S. mearnsi Heller, 1910	Eastern Africa	Size: 10–15 cm (4–6 in) long, plus 3–8 cm (1–3 in) tail Habitat: Savanna, shrubland, and desert Diet: Seeds, berries, grains, and nuts, as well as insects	LC Unknown
South African pouched mouse	S. campestris Peters, 1846	Southern Africa	Size: 9–18 cm (4–7 in) long, plus 2–6 cm (1–2 in) tail Habitat: Savanna, shrubland, grassland, and desert Diet: Seeds, berries, grains, and nuts, as well as insects	LC Unknown

=== Subfamily Delanymyinae ===
Genus Delanymys – Hayman, 1962 – one species
Common name	Scientific name and subspecies	Range	Size and ecology	IUCN status and estimated population
Delany's mouse	D. brooksi Hayman, 1962	Central Africa	Size: 5–7 cm (2–3 in) long, plus 8–12 cm (3–5 in) tail Habitat: Shrubland and inland wetlands Diet: Seeds	VU Unknown

=== Subfamily Dendromurinae ===
Genus Dendromus – Smith, 1829 – fourteen species
Common name	Scientific name and subspecies	Range	Size and ecology	IUCN status and estimated population
Banana climbing mouse	D. messorius (Thomas, 1903)	Central and western Africa	Size: 5–7 cm (2–3 in) long, plus 7–10 cm (3–4 in) tail Habitat: Grassland Diet: Seeds, berries, insects, eggs, small lizards, and small birds	LC Unknown
Brants's climbing mouse	D. mesomelas (Brants, 1827)	Southern Africa	Size: 6–9 cm (2–4 in) long, plus 7–13 cm (3–5 in) tail Habitat: Forest, savanna, shrubland, and grassland Diet: Seeds, berries, insects, eggs, small lizards, and small birds	LC Unknown
Cameroon climbing mouse	D. oreas Osgood, 1936	Cameroon	Size: 6–8 cm (2–3 in) long, plus 8–11 cm (3–4 in) tail Habitat: Grassland Diet: Seeds, berries, insects, eggs, small lizards, and small birds	LC Unknown
Chestnut climbing mouse	D. mystacalis (Heuglin, 1863)	Eastern and southern Africa	Size: 4–8 cm (2–3 in) long, plus 6–11 cm (2–4 in) tail Habitat: Savanna and grassland Diet: Seeds, berries, insects, eggs, small lizards, and small birds	LC Unknown
Gray climbing mouse	D. melanotis (Smith, 1834)	Sub-Saharan Africa	Size: 5–8 cm (2–3 in) long, plus 5–10 cm (2–4 in) tail Habitat: Savanna, shrubland, grassland, and desert Diet: Seeds, berries, insects, eggs, small lizards, and small birds	LC Unknown
Kivu climbing mouse	D. nyasae Thomas, 1916	Southern Africa	Size: 6–8 cm (2–3 in) long, plus 8–11 cm (3–4 in) tail Habitat: Forest, savanna, shrubland, and grassland Diet: Seeds, berries, insects, eggs, small lizards, and small birds	NE Unknown
Lachaise's climbing mouse	D. lachaisei Denys & Aniskine, 2012	Western Africa	Size: 5–8 cm (2–3 in) long, plus 7–10 cm (3–4 in) tail Habitat: Forest and savanna Diet: Seeds, berries, insects, eggs, small lizards, and small birds	VU Unknown
Lovat's climbing mouse	D. lovati (de Winton, 1900)	Ethiopia	Size: 5–10 cm (2–4 in) long, plus 5–9 cm (2–4 in) tail Habitat: Grassland Diet: Seeds, berries, insects, eggs, small lizards, and small birds	LC Unknown
Monard's African climbing mouse	D. leucostomus Monard, 1933	Angola	Size: 4–7 cm (2–3 in) long, plus 5–8 cm (2–3 in) tail Habitat: Savanna and grassland Diet: Seeds, berries, insects, eggs, small lizards, and small birds	NE Unknown
Montane African climbing mouse	D. insignis (Thomas, 1903)	East-central Africa	Size: 7–10 cm (3–4 in) long, plus 8–12 cm (3–5 in) tail Habitat: Forest, shrubland, grassland, and inland wetlands Diet: Seeds, berries, insects, eggs, small lizards, and small birds	LC Unknown
Mount Kahuzi climbing mouse	D. kahuziensis (Dieterlen, 1969)	Democratic Republic of the Congo	Size: 7–9 cm (3–4 in) long, plus 12–14 cm (5–6 in) tail Habitat: Forest Diet: Seeds, berries, insects, eggs, small lizards, and small birds	CR Unknown
Nyika climbing mouse	D. nyikae Wroughton, 1909	Southern Africa	Size: 6–8 cm (2–3 in) long, plus 8–10 cm (3–4 in) tail Habitat: Forest, savanna, shrubland, and grassland Diet: Seeds, berries, insects, eggs, small lizards, and small birds	LC Unknown
Rupp's African climbing mouse	D. ruppi Dieterlen, 2009	South Sudan	Size: 6–9 cm (2–4 in) long, plus 9–12 cm (4–5 in) tail Habitat: Inland wetlands Diet: Seeds, berries, insects, eggs, small lizards, and small birds	DD Unknown
Vernay's climbing mouse	D. vernayi Hill & Carter, 1937	Angola	Size: 6–8 cm (2–3 in) long, plus 8–9 cm (3–4 in) tail Habitat: Savanna Diet: Seeds, berries, insects, eggs, small lizards, and small birds	DD Unknown

Genus Dendroprionomys – Petter, 1966 – one species
Common name	Scientific name and subspecies	Range	Size and ecology	IUCN status and estimated population
Velvet climbing mouse	D. rousseloti Petter, 1966	Republic of the Congo	Size: About 8 cm (3 in) long, plus about 11 cm (4 in) tail Habitat: Unknown Diet: Insects	DD Unknown

Genus Malacothrix – Candolle, 1838 – one species
Common name	Scientific name and subspecies	Range	Size and ecology	IUCN status and estimated population
Gerbil mouse	M. typica (Smith, 1834)	Southern Africa	Size: 6–9 cm (2–4 in) long, plus 2–5 cm (1–2 in) tail Habitat: Desert, shrubland, and savanna Diet: Green vegetation	LC Unknown

Genus Megadendromus – Dieterlen & Rupp, 1978 – one species
Common name	Scientific name and subspecies	Range	Size and ecology	IUCN status and estimated population
Nikolaus's mouse	M. nikolausi Dieterlen & Rupp, 1978	Ethiopia	Size: 11–13 cm (4–5 in) long, plus 9–11 cm (4 in) tail Habitat: Shrubland Diet: Likely vegetation and insects	VU Unknown

Genus Prionomys – Dollman, 1910 – one species
Common name	Scientific name and subspecies	Range	Size and ecology	IUCN status and estimated population
Dollman's tree mouse	P. batesi Dollman, 1910	West-central Africa	Size: 7–9 cm (3–4 in) long, plus 10–12 cm (4–5 in) tail Habitat: Forest Diet: Insects	DD Unknown

Genus Steatomys – Peters, 1846 – eight species
Common name	Scientific name and subspecies	Range	Size and ecology	IUCN status and estimated population
Bocage's African fat mouse	S. bocagei (Thomas, 1892)	Angola and Democratic Republic of the Congo	Size: 9–13 cm (4–5 in) long, plus 5–8 cm (2–3 in) tail Habitat: Forest, savanna, and shrubland Diet: Seeds, grass bulbs, and insects	LC Unknown
Dainty fat mouse	S. cuppedius Thomas & Hinton, 1920	Western Africa	Size: 7–10 cm (3–4 in) long, plus 4–5 cm (2 in) tail Habitat: Shrubland and grassland Diet: Seeds, grass bulbs, and insects	LC Unknown
Fat mouse	S. pratensis Peters, 1846	Central and southern Africa	Size: 8–11 cm (3–4 in) long, plus 4–6 cm (2 in) tail Habitat: Savanna and grassland Diet: Seeds, grass bulbs, and insects	LC Unknown
Jackson's fat mouse	S. jacksoni Hayman, 1936	Ghana and Nigeria	Size: About 12 cm (5 in) long, plus about 5 cm (2 in) tail Habitat: Unknown Diet: Seeds, grass bulbs, and insects	DD Unknown
Krebs's fat mouse	S. krebsii Peters, 1852	Southern Africa	Size: 7–10 cm (3–4 in) long, plus 3–6 cm (1–2 in) tail Habitat: Shrubland and grassland Diet: Seeds, grass bulbs, and insects	LC Unknown
Northwestern fat mouse	S. caurinus Thomas, 1912	Western Africa	Size: 9–13 cm (4–5 in) long, plus 3–5 cm (1–2 in) tail Habitat: Shrubland Diet: Seeds, grass bulbs, and insects	LC Unknown
Pousargues African fat mouse	S. opimus (Pousargues, 1894)	Central Africa	Size: 11–13 cm (4–5 in) long, plus 5–7 cm (2–3 in) tail Habitat: Forest and savanna Diet: Seeds, grass bulbs, and insects	LC Unknown
Tiny fat mouse	S. parvus Rhoads, 1896	Eastern and southern Africa	Size: 5–9 cm (2–4 in) long, plus 3–6 cm (1–2 in) tail Habitat: Savanna, shrubland, and grassland Diet: Seeds, grass bulbs, and insects	LC Unknown

=== Subfamily Mystromyinae ===
Genus Mystromys – Wagner, 1841 – one species
Common name	Scientific name and subspecies	Range	Size and ecology	IUCN status and estimated population
White-tailed rat	M. albicaudatus (Smith, 1834)	Southern Africa	Size: 11–20 cm (4–8 in) long, plus 4–9 cm (2–4 in) tail Habitat: Shrubland and grassland Diet: Seeds, vegetable matter, and insects	VU 7,000–14,000

=== Subfamily Nesomyinae ===
Genus Brachytarsomys – Günther, 1875 – two species
Common name	Scientific name and subspecies	Range	Size and ecology	IUCN status and estimated population
Hairy-tailed antsangy	B. villosa Petter, 1962	Northern Madagascar	Size: 23–24 cm (9 in) long, plus 26–27 cm (10–11 in) tail Habitat: Forest Diet: Fruit	VU Unknown
White-tailed antsangy	B. albicauda Günther, 1875	Eastern Madagascar	Size: 22–23 cm (9 in) long, plus 22–24 cm (9 in) tail Habitat: Forest Diet: Fruit	LC Unknown

Genus Brachyuromys – Forsyth Major, 1896 – two species
Common name	Scientific name and subspecies	Range	Size and ecology	IUCN status and estimated population
Betsileo short-tailed rat	B. betsileoensis (Bartlett, 1880)	Eastern Madagascar	Size: 14–19 cm (6–7 in) long, plus 7–10 cm (3–4 in) tail Habitat: Forest, shrubland, grassland, and inland wetlands Diet: Likely vegetation and insects	LC Unknown
Gregarious short-tailed rat	B. ramirohitra Forsyth Major, 1896	Eastern Madagascar	Size: 14–17 cm (6–7 in) long, plus 8–11 cm (3–4 in) tail Habitat: Forest Diet: Likely vegetation and insects	LC Unknown

Genus Eliurus – A. Milne-Edwards, 1885 – twelve species
Common name	Scientific name and subspecies	Range	Size and ecology	IUCN status and estimated population
Ankarana Special Reserve tufted-tailed rat	E. carletoni Goodman, Raheriarisena, & Jansa, 2009	Northern Madagascar	Size: 14–15 cm (6 in) long, plus 16–19 cm (6–7 in) tail Habitat: Forest Diet: Likely vegetation and insects	LC Unknown
Daniel's tufted-tailed rat	E. danieli Goodman & Carleton, 2007	Southern Madagascar	Size: 15–16 cm (6 in) long, plus 17–20 cm (7–8 in) tail Habitat: Shrubland Diet: Likely vegetation and insects	LC Unknown
Dormouse tufted-tailed rat	E. myoxinus A. Milne-Edwards, 1855	Northern, western, and southern Madagascar	Size: 11–14 cm (4–6 in) long, plus 12–17 cm (5–7 in) tail Habitat: Forest Diet: Likely vegetation and insects	LC Unknown
Ellerman's tufted-tailed rat	E. ellermani Carleton, 1994	Eastern Madagascar	Size: About 15 cm (6 in) long, plus about 18 cm (7 in) tail Habitat: Forest Diet: Likely vegetation and insects	DD Unknown
Grandidier's tufted-tailed rat	E. grandidieri Goodman & Carleton, 1998	Northeastern Madagascar	Size: 11–17 cm (4–7 in) long, plus 14–18 cm (6–7 in) tail Habitat: Forest Diet: Likely vegetation and insects	LC Unknown
Lesser tufted-tailed rat	E. minor Forsyth Major, 1896	Northern and eastern Madagascar	Size: 10–13 cm (4–5 in) long, plus 11–14 cm (4–6 in) tail Habitat: Forest Diet: Likely vegetation and insects	LC Unknown
Major's tufted-tailed rat	E. majori Thomas, 1895	Eastern Madagascar	Size: 13–17 cm (5–7 in) long, plus 15–20 cm (6–8 in) tail Habitat: Forest Diet: Likely vegetation and insects	LC Unknown
Petter's tufted-tailed rat	E. petteri Carleton, 1994	Eastern Madagascar	Size: About 13 cm (5 in) long, plus about 19 cm (7 in) tail Habitat: Forest Diet: Likely vegetation and insects	EN Unknown
Tanala tufted-tailed rat	E. tanala Forsyth Major, 1896	Eastern Madagascar	Size: 14–16 cm (6 in) long, plus 15–20 cm (6–8 in) tail Habitat: Forest Diet: Likely vegetation and insects	LC Unknown
Tsingy tufted-tailed rat	E. antsingy Goodman, Rakotondravony, & Carleton, 2001	Northern Madagascar	Size: 14–16 cm (6 in) long, plus 15–20 cm (6–8 in) tail Habitat: Forest Diet: Likely vegetation and insects	DD Unknown
Webb's tufted-tailed rat	E. webbi Ellerman, 1949	Eastern Madagascar	Size: 14–16 cm (6 in) long, plus 16–19 cm (6–7 in) tail Habitat: Forest Diet: Likely vegetation and insects	LC Unknown
White-tipped tufted-tailed rat	E. penicillatus Thomas, 1908	East-central Madagascar	Size: About 15 cm (6 in) long, plus about 17 cm (7 in) tail Habitat: Forest Diet: Likely vegetation and insects	EN Unknown

Genus Gymnuromys – Forsyth Major, 1896 – one species
Common name	Scientific name and subspecies	Range	Size and ecology	IUCN status and estimated population
Voalavoanala	G. roberti Forsyth Major, 1896	Eastern Madagascar	Size: 15–18 cm (6–7 in) long, plus 14–20 cm (6–8 in) tail Habitat: Forest Diet: Likely vegetation and insects	LC Unknown

Genus Hypogeomys – Grandidier, 1869 – one species
Common name	Scientific name and subspecies	Range	Size and ecology	IUCN status and estimated population
Malagasy giant rat	H. antimena Grandidier, 1869	Western Madagascar	Size: 30–34 cm (12–13 in) long, plus 21–24 cm (8–9 in) tail Habitat: Forest Diet: Fruit	CR 5,000

Genus Macrotarsomys – A. Milne-Edwards & Grandidier, 1898 – three species
Common name	Scientific name and subspecies	Range	Size and ecology	IUCN status and estimated population
Bastard big-footed mouse	M. bastardi A. Milne-Edwards & Grandidier, 1898	Western Madagascar	Size: 8–11 cm (3–4 in) long, plus 12–15 cm (5–6 in) tail Habitat: Forest and shrubland Diet: Berries, fruit, seeds, roots, and stems	LC Unknown
Greater big-footed mouse	M. ingens (Petter, 1959)	Northern Madagascar	Size: 11–15 cm (4–6 in) long, plus 18–24 cm (7–9 in) tail Habitat: Forest Diet: Berries, fruit, seeds, roots, and stems	EN Unknown
Petter's big-footed mouse	M. petteri Goodman & Soarimalala, 2005	Southern Madagascar	Size: About 16 cm (6 in) long, plus about 24 cm (9 in) tail Habitat: Forest Diet: Berries, fruit, seeds, roots, and stems	DD Unknown

Genus Monticolomys – Goodman & Carleton, 1996 – one species
Common name	Scientific name and subspecies	Range	Size and ecology	IUCN status and estimated population
Malagasy mountain mouse	M. koopmani Goodman & Carleton, 1996	Northern, central, and southern Madagascar	Size: 9–11 cm (4 in) long, plus 13–15 cm (5–6 in) tail Habitat: Forest Diet: Likely vegetation and insects	LC Unknown

Genus Nesomys – Peters, 1870 – three species
Common name	Scientific name and subspecies	Range	Size and ecology	IUCN status and estimated population
Island mouse	N. rufus Peters, 1870	Eastern Madagascar	Size: 17–20 cm (7–8 in) long, plus 16–18 cm (6–7 in) tail Habitat: Forest Diet: Fruit and nuts	LC Unknown
Western nesomys	N. lambertoni Grandidier, 1928	Western Madagascar	Size: 18–20 cm (7–8 in) long, plus 18–20 cm (7–8 in) tail Habitat: Forest Diet: Fruit and nuts	EN Unknown
White-bellied nesomys	N. audeberti Jentink, 1879	Eastern Madagascar	Size: 19–20 cm (7–8 in) long, plus 16–18 cm (6–7 in) tail Habitat: Forest Diet: Fruit and nuts	LC Unknown

Genus Voalavo – Goodman & Carleton, 1998 – two species
Common name	Scientific name and subspecies	Range	Size and ecology	IUCN status and estimated population
Eastern voalavo	V. antsahabensis Goodman, Rakotondravony, Randriamanantsoa, & Rakotomalala-Razanahoera, 2005	Central Madagascar (in green)	Size: 8–10 cm (3–4 in) long, plus 10–13 cm (4–5 in) tail Habitat: Forest Diet: Likely vegetation and insects	EN Unknown
Northern voalavo	V. gymnocaudus Goodman & Carleton, 1998	Northern Madagascar (in red)	Size: 8–9 cm (3–4 in) long, plus 12–13 cm (5 in) tail Habitat: Forest Diet: Likely vegetation and insects	LC Unknown

=== Subfamily Petromyscinae ===
Genus Petromyscus – Thomas, 1926 – four species
Common name	Scientific name and subspecies	Range	Size and ecology	IUCN status and estimated population
Barbour's rock mouse	P. barbouri Shortridge, 1938	South Africa	Size: 7–8 cm (3 in) long, plus 7–9 cm (3–4 in) tail Habitat: Shrubland and rocky areas Diet: Omnivorous	LC Unknown
Brukkaros pygmy rock mouse	P. monticularis (Thomas & Hinton, 1925)	Namibia and South Africa	Size: 6–10 cm (2–4 in) long, plus 6–9 cm (2–4 in) tail Habitat: Shrubland and rocky areas Diet: Omnivorous	LC Unknown
Pygmy rock mouse	P. collinus (Hinton, 1925)	Southwestern Africa	Size: 7–10 cm (3–4 in) long, plus 7–13 cm (3–5 in) tail Habitat: Shrubland and rocky areas Diet: Omnivorous	LC Unknown
Shortridge's rock mouse	P. shortridgei Thomas, 1926	Angola and Namibia	Size: 6–10 cm (2–4 in) long, plus 7–11 cm (3–4 in) tail Habitat: Shrubland and rocky areas Diet: Omnivorous	LC Unknown

== Sources ==
- Chernasky, Amy; Motis, Anna; Burgin, Connor, eds. (2023). All the Mammals of the World. Lynx Nature Books. ISBN 978-84-16728-66-4.
- Nowak, Ronald M. (1999). Walker's Mammals of the World. Vol. 2 (6th ed.). Johns Hopkins University Press. ISBN 978-0-8018-5789-8.
- Musser, Guy G.; Carleton, Michael D. (2005). Wilson, Don E.; Reeder, DeeAnn M. (eds.). Mammal Species of the World. Vol. 2 (3rd ed.). Johns Hopkins University Press. ISBN 978-0-8018-8221-0.
