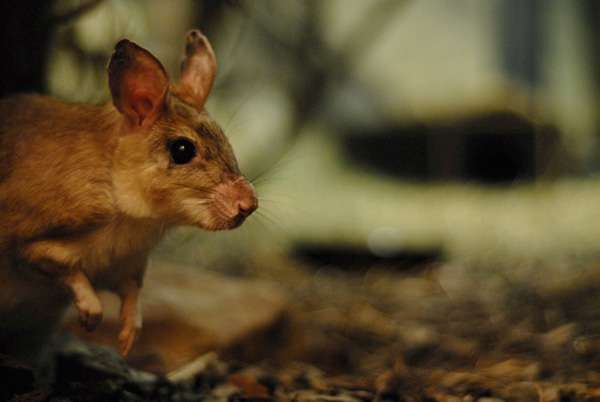
- The Malagasy giant rat Hypogeomys antimena has a body length of 30–35 cm (12–14 in).

Scientific classification
- Kingdom: Animalia
- Phylum: Chordata
- Class: Mammalia
- Order: Rodentia
- Family: Nesomyidae
- Subfamily: Nesomyinae; Forsyth Major, 1897

Genera
- Brachytarsomys; Brachyuromys; Eliurus; Gymnuromys; Hypogeomys; Macrotarsomys; Monticolomys; Nesomys; Voalavo

= Nesomyinae =

Malagasy rodents Temporal range: Middle Miocene - Recent

Subfamily of rodents

The Malagasy rodents are the sole members of the subfamily Nesomyinae. These animals are the only native rodents of Madagascar, come in many shapes and sizes, and occupy a wide variety of ecological niches. There are nesomyines that resemble gerbils, rats, mice, voles, and even rabbits. There are arboreal, terrestrial, and semi-fossorial varieties.

These rodents are clearly most closely related to some muroid rodents found on the African mainland. Some molecular phylogeneticists consider this clade of Malagasy and African rodents to represent a distinct family, the Nesomyidae. Other researchers place the Nesomyinae into a large family, Muridae, along with all members of the superfamily Muroidea.

It has been reported that the Nesomyinae is not monophyletic, but this has not been supported in other analyses. Additionally, there were problems with this particular study, notably the use of Calomyscus as an outgroup while more distantly related muroids (rhyzomyines) were included in the ingroup. It seems likely that all rodents in Madagascar are descendants from a single invasion of the island.

If monophyletic, the nesomyines represent one of only four colonization events of terrestrial mammals from mainland Africa. The other groups are tenrecs, lemurs and Malagasy carnivorans. Molecular clock analyses suggest that the ancestor of the nesomyines colonized Madagascar about 20–25 million years ago. This is at approximately the same time as the Malagasy carnivorans, but is considerably more recent than the estimated colonization times of tenrecs and lemurs.

Nesomyinae contains 9 genera and 27 species.

== Taxonomy ==
Subfamily Nesomyinae - Malagasy rodents

- Genus Brachytarsomys - Malagasy white-tailed rats
  - White-tailed antsangy, Brachytarsomys albicauda
  - Brachytarsomys mahajambaensis (extinct)
  - Hairy-tailed antsangy, Brachytarsomys villosa
- Genus Brachyuromys - Malagasy short-tailed rats
  - Betsileo short-tailed rat, Brachyuromys betsileoensis
  - Gregarious short-tailed rat, Brachyuromys ramirohitra
- Genus Eliurus - Tufted-tailed rats
  - Tsingy tufted-tailed rat, Eliurus antsingy
  - Ankarana Special Reserve tufted-tailed rat, Eliurus carletoni
  - Ellerman's tufted-tailed rat, Eliurus ellermani
  - Daniel's tufted-tailed rat, Eliurus danieli
  - Grandidier's tufted-tailed rat, Eliurus grandidieri
  - Major's tufted-tailed rat, Eliurus majori
  - Lesser tufted-tailed rat, Eliurus minor
  - Dormouse tufted-tailed rat, Eliurus myoxinus
  - White-tipped tufted-tailed rat, Eliurus penicillatus
  - Petter's tufted-tailed rat, Eliurus petteri
  - Tanala tufted-tailed rat, Eliurus tanala
  - Webb's tufted-tailed rat, Eliurus webbi
- Genus Gymnuromys
  - Voalavoanala, Gymnuromys roberti
- Genus Hypogeomys
  - Votsovotsa (Malagasy giant rat), Hypogeomys antimena
  - Hypogeomys australis (extinct)
- Genus Macrotarsomys - Big-footed mice
  - Bastard big-footed mouse, Macrotarsomys bastardi
  - Greater big-footed mouse, Macrotarsomys ingens
  - Petter's big-footed mouse, Macrotarsomys petteri
- Genus Monticolomys
  - Malagasy mountain mouse, Monticolomys koopmani
- Genus Nesomys
  - White-bellied nesomys, Nesomys audeberti
  - Western nesomys, Nesomys lambertoni
  - Nesomys narindaensis (extinct)
  - Island mouse, Nesomys rufus
- Genus Voalavo
  - Eastern voalavo, Voalavo antsahabensis
  - Northern voalavo, Voalavo gymnocaudus
