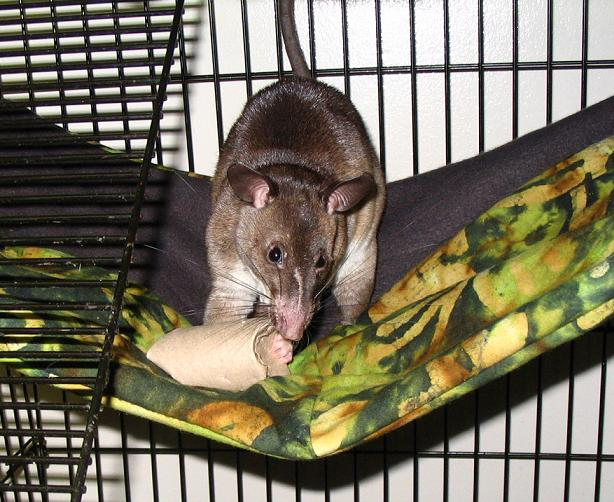
- Cricetomys emini

Scientific classification
- Kingdom: Animalia
- Phylum: Chordata
- Class: Mammalia
- Order: Rodentia
- Family: Nesomyidae
- Subfamily: Cricetomyinae; Roberts, 1951

Genera
- Beamys; Cricetomys; Saccostomus

= Pouched rat =

Pouched rats Temporal range: Early Pliocene - Recent

Subfamily of rodents

Pouched rats are a group of African rodents in the subfamily Cricetomyinae. They are members of the family Nesomyidae, which contains other African muroids such as climbing mice, Malagasy mice, and the white-tailed rat. All nesomyids are in the superfamily Muroidea, a large and complex clade containing 1/4 of all mammal species. Sometimes the pouched rats are placed in the family Muridae along with all other members of the superfamily Muroidea.

Pouched rats are found throughout much of sub-Saharan Africa with the exception of southern Africa. They are characterized by having large cheek pouches and a distinctive molar morphology. The molars are very similar to the type seen in the subfamily Murinae, but pouched rats probably evolved this similarity through convergent evolution.

There are three very different genera of pouched rats. The giant pouched rat is notable for being the largest of the muroids. A giant pouched rat was also implicated as a carrier in a small outbreak of monkeypox in the US. The three genera of Cricetomyinaeds contain eight species.

== Classification ==
Subfamily Cricetomyinae - pouched rats

- Genus Beamys
  - Lesser hamster-rat, Beamys hindei
  - Greater hamster-rat, Beamys major
- Genus Cricetomys - giant pouched rats
  - Southern giant pouched rat, Cricetomys ansorgei
  - Gambian pouched rat, Cricetomys gambianus
  - Emin's pouched rat, Cricetomys emini
  - Kivu giant pouched rat, Cricetomys kivuensis
- Genus Saccostomus - pouched mice
  - South African pouched mouse, Saccostomus campestris
  - Mearns's pouched mouse, Saccostomus mearnsi

== Sources ==
- Jansa, S.A.; Weksler, M. "Phylogeny of muroid rodents: Relationships within and among major lineages as determined by IRBP gene sequences". Molecular Phylogenetics and Evolution. 31: 256–276.
- Kingdon, J. (1997). The Kingdon Field Guide to African Mammals. London, UK: Academic Press Limited.
- Steppan, S.J.; Adkins, R.A.; Anderson, J. (2004). "Phylogeny and divergence date estimates of rapid radiations in muroid rodents based on multiple nuclear genes". Systematic Biology. 53: 533–553.
