= Petter's tufted-tailed rat =

Conservation status
- Endangered (IUCN 3.1)

Scientific classification
- Kingdom: Animalia
- Phylum: Chordata
- Class: Mammalia
- Order: Rodentia
- Family: Nesomyidae
- Genus: Eliurus
- Species: E. petteri

Binomial name
- Eliurus petteri Carleton, 1994

Rodent found in eastern Madagascar

Petter's tufted-tailed rat (Eliurus petteri) is a rodent in the genus Eliurus found in lowland eastern Madagascar. First described in 1994, it is most closely related to the smaller Eliurus grandidieri. Virtually nothing is known of its natural history, except that it occurs in rainforest and is nocturnal and solitary. It is threatened by destruction and fragmentation of its habitat and is listed as "Endangered" on the IUCN Red List.

With a head and body length of 130 to 136 mm (5.1 to 5.4 in), Eliurus petteri is a moderately large species of Eliurus. Its upperparts are gray-brown to gray and contrast sharply with the white underparts. The tail tuft, a characteristic feature of Eliurus, is weakly developed. The skull is delicate and the incisive foramina (openings in the front part of the palate) are short and narrow. The incisors are weak.

== Taxonomy ==
Eliurus petteri was first described in 1994 by American zoologist Michael Carleton as part of a revision of the genus Eliurus. Carleton had only three specimens of the new species, which had been collected in 1929, 1956, and 1963 in close proximity in an area of eastern Madagascar. The specific name honors French biologist François Petter, who has contributed to the scientific study of the nesomyines. In 1998, Carleton and Steven Goodman described a related species, Eliurus grandidieri, from the Northern Highlands of Madagascar. Surprisingly, DNA sequence data suggest that this species is more closely related to Voalavo gymnocaudus than to other species of Eliurus; however, E. petteri has not been studied genetically. Carleton and Goodman reported additional occurrences of E. petteri (though within the same general area) in 2007, and formally recognized the "Eliurus petteri group" (including E. grandidieri and E. petteri) as one of five species groups within the genus.

The common names "Petter's Tuft-tailed Rat" and "Petter's Tufted-tailed Rat" have been used for this species. It is now one of twelve species recognized within Eliurus, the most diverse and widespread genus of the native Malagasy rodents (subfamily Nesomyinae).

== Description ==
Measurements of Eliurus petteri and the related E. grandidieri
| Species | n | Head-body | Tail | Hindfoot | Ear | Mass |
|---|---|---|---|---|---|---|
| E. grandidieri | 42–60 | 111–164 | 144–176 | 26–31 | 19–23 | 44.5–67.5 |
| E. petteri | 2 | 130, 136 | 178, 185 | 30, 31 (Note: Carleton 2003, table 13.43 gives these values, but Carleton 1994, p. 55 gives the hindfoot lengths of the same two specimens as 31.5 and 33.0 mm and Carleton & Goodman 1998, table 11-2 give 33 and 34 mm.) | 19, 22 | 74.0 (n = 1) |
n: Number of specimens measured (unless otherwise indicated). All measurements are in millimeters, except body mass in grams.

Eliurus petteri is a fairly large, long-tailed species of Eliurus that resembles a smaller version of Eliurus webbi. It is larger than the closely related E. grandidieri. The fur is soft and fine. The upperparts appear gray-brown to gray in overall color; individual hairs are light gray for most of their length, then pale buff, and dark brown to black at the tip. Dark guard hairs—longer hairs projecting above the main fur—are present, but relatively short. The underparts are entirely white, a feature unique for the genus; even E. grandidieri has dark gray underparts. The transition between the coloration of the upper- and underparts is sharp. The mystacial vibrissae (whiskers on the upper lip) are 50 to 60 mm (2.0 to 2.4 in) long and extend beyond the ears when pressed against the head. In some specimens, the eyes are surrounded by a dark ring. The pinnae (external ears) are dark and appear naked, but are covered by fine brown fur on the outer and by white hairs on the inner surface. The forefeet are entirely white above, but a narrow dark streak is present on the hindfeet. The skin of the tail is dark, sometimes with some white spots on the lower side. Although the tail appears mostly naked, it is covered with inconspicuous hairs. The tail tuft—characteristic of the genus Eliurus—is weakly developed and consists of light brown to grayish brown hairs along the 25 to 30% of the tail closest to the tip.

The skull looks delicate. The interorbital region (between the eyes) is narrow and hourglass-shaped, and the braincase is smooth; both lack conspicuously developed ridges and shelves. The zygomatic arches (cheekbones) are poorly developed. The incisive foramina (openings in the front part of the palate) are short and narrow. The bony palate ends at the level of the back of the third upper molars. The alisphenoid strut (a piece of bone at the back of the skull separating two foramina, or openings) is absent. The strut is present in most Eliurus, but absent in some specimens of E. grandidieri. The subsquamosal fenestrae (openings in the squamosal bone) are fairly large. The auditory bullae are small. The incisors are weak and the enamel on the upper incisors is yellow to light orange. The root of the lower incisor does not project into a distinct capsular process at the back of the mandible (lower jaw), a feature shared only with E. grandidieri among species of Eliurus.

== Distribution and ecology ==
Eliurus petteri is known only from a limited area in the foothills of eastern Madagascar (Toamasina Province), where it occurs from 450 to 1,145 m (1,476 to 3,757 ft) above sea level. It occurs in close proximity with E. minor, E. tanala, and E. webbi, and is probably sympatric with them. Information on the natural history of E. petteri is extremely limited. It occurs in lowland rainforest and is probably arboreal or scansorial (climbing in vegetation). It is nocturnal and solitary and may eat fruits, seeds, and insects. The weak incisors suggest to Carleton that it eats more "indurate" fruits and insects than other Eliurus.

== Conservation status ==
Destruction and fragmentation of its habitat are major threats to Eliurus petteri, which is not known to occur in any protected area. Furthermore, it may be vulnerable to plague transmitted by introduced rodents. Accordingly, it is classified as "Endangered" on the IUCN Red List.

== Literature cited ==
- Carleton, M.D. (1994). "Systematic studies of Madagascar's endemic rodents (Muroidea: Nesomyinae): revision of the genus Eliurus". American Museum Novitates (3087): 1–55. hdl:2246/4984.
- Carleton, M.D. (2003). "Eliurus, Tufted-tailed Rats". In Goodman, S.M.; Benstead, J.P. (eds.). The Natural History of Madagascar. Chicago and London: The University of Chicago Press. pp. 1373–1380. ISBN 978-0-226-30307-9.
- Carleton, M.D.; Goodman, S.M. (1998). "New taxa of nesomyine rodents (Muroidea: Muridae) from Madagascar's northern highlands, with taxonomic comments on previously described forms". Fieldiana Zoology. 90: 163–200.
- Carleton, M.D.; Goodman, S.M. (2007). "A new species of the Eliurus majori complex (Rodentia: Muroidea: Nesomyidae) from south-central Madagascar, with remarks on emergent species groupings in the genus Eliurus". American Museum Novitates (3547): 1–21. doi:10.1206/0003-0082(2007)3547[1:ANSOTE]2.0.CO;2. hdl:2246/5834. S2CID 83860204.
- Garbutt, N. (2007). Mammals of Madagascar: A Complete Guide. London: A & C Black. ISBN 978-0-7136-7043-1.
- Goodman, S.M.; Ganzhorn, J.U.; Rakotondravony, D. (2003). "Introduction to the mammals". In Goodman, S.M.; Benstead, J.P. (eds.). The Natural History of Madagascar. Chicago and London: The University of Chicago Press. pp. 1159–1186. ISBN 978-0-226-30307-9.
- Goodman, S.M.; Raheriarisena, M.; Jansa, S.A. (2009). "A new species of Eliurus Milne Edwards, 1885 (Rodentia: Nesomyinae) from the Réserve Spéciale d'Ankarana, northern Madagascar" (PDF). Bonner zoologische Beiträge. 56 (3): 133–149. Archived from the original (PDF) on 2011-02-07.
- Goodman, S.; Rakotondravony, D. (2008). "Eliurus petteri". IUCN Red List of Threatened Species. 2008 e.T136316A4273552. doi:10.2305/IUCN.UK.2008.RLTS.T136316A4273552.en.
- Kennerley, R.; Goodman, S. (2016). "Eliurus petteri". IUCN Red List of Threatened Species. 2016. doi:10.2305/IUCN.UK.2016-3.RLTS.T136316A22238985.en.
- Musser, G.G.; Carleton, M.D. (2005). "Superfamily Muroidea". In Wilson, D.E.; Reeder, D.M. (eds.). Mammal Species of the World: A Taxonomic and Geographic Reference. Baltimore: The Johns Hopkins University Press. pp. 894–1531. ISBN 978-0-8018-8221-0.
