= Malacothrix =

Malacothrix may refer to:

- Malacothrix (mammal), a genus of rodents
- Malacothrix (plant), a genus of plants
