= Daniel's tufted-tailed rat =

Conservation status
- Least Concern (IUCN 3.1)

Scientific classification
- Kingdom: Animalia
- Phylum: Chordata
- Class: Mammalia
- Order: Rodentia
- Family: Nesomyidae
- Genus: Eliurus
- Species: E. danieli

Binomial name
- Eliurus danieli Carleton & Goodman, 2007
- Eliurus danieli range

Species of rodent

Daniel's tufted-tailed rat (Eliurus danieli) is a species of rodent in the family Nesomyidae. It was discovered in 2003 in the Parc National de l'Isalo in south-central Madagascar. It is named for Daniel Rakotondravony, professor of animal biology at the University of Antananarivo, Madagascar.

Daniel's tufted-tailed rat first became known in 1995, when a specimen was found to belong to the majori-penicillatus complex. Molecular data suggested that Major's tufted-tailed rat (Eliurus majori) was a close relative; study of two more animals found in 2002 indicated that the two are different species.

== Description ==
The head-and-body length of Daniel's tufted-tailed rat is about 150 mm (6 in) and the tail is a further 185 mm (7.3 in). The fine soft hairs on the dorsal (upper) surface of the body are about 10 mm (0.4 in) long, and are grey, tipped with buff. The guard hairs are dark brown to black and slightly longer than the cover hairs. The general dorsal colour of the animal is a brownish grey, with a plain grey face, forehead and limbs. There is a sharp line separating the upper parts from the underparts. and the latter are buffish white. The feet are white and there is a tuft of white hairs at the base of each claw. The basal third of the tail is semi-naked, the central third is scantily clad with short black hairs, and the distal third has a tuft of bright white hairs which are up to 15 mm (0.6 in) in length.

A male specimen found in December 2002 was found to have scrotal testes with convoluted epididymis. This species has a notably rounded braincase, certainly in comparison with the Tsingy tufted-tailed rat (Eliurus antsingy).
