= Petter's big-footed mouse =

Conservation status
- Data Deficient (IUCN 3.1)

Scientific classification
- Kingdom: Animalia
- Phylum: Chordata
- Class: Mammalia
- Order: Rodentia
- Family: Nesomyidae
- Genus: Macrotarsomys
- Species: M. petteri

Binomial name
- Macrotarsomys petteri Goodman and Soarimalala, 2005
- Range of Macrotarsomys petteri on Madagascar. Red: find of a living animal; green: subfossil material; blue: subfossil material that is possibly referable to this species

Species of Madagascan rodent

Petter's big-footed mouse (Macrotarsomys petteri) is a rodent in the genus Macrotarsomys. With a head and body length of 150 mm (5.9 in) and body mass of 105 g (3.7 oz), it is the largest species of its genus. Its upper body is brown, darkest in the middle of the back, and the lower body is white to yellowish. The animal has long whiskers, short forelimbs, and long hindfeet. The tail ends in a prominent tuft of long, light hairs. The skull is robust and the molars are low-crowned and cuspidate.

Petter's big-footed mouse is now found only in the Mikea Forest of southwestern Madagascar, but subfossil records indicate that it used to be more widely distributed in southern Madagascar. Climatic changes and competition with introduced species may have led to the shift in its distribution. The Mikea Forest, the only place where it is still known to occur, is threatened by human development.

== Taxonomy ==
During a 2003 biological inventory of the Mikea Forest, a forest region of southwestern Madagascar, a single specimen of the rodent genus Macrotarsomys was collected. This animal turned out to be distinct from both previously known species of the genus—bastard big-footed mouse, which is widespread in western Madagascar, and the larger greater big-footed mouse, known only from the Ankarafantsika National Park. Accordingly, Steven Goodman and Voahangy Soarimalala named it in 2005 as a new species, Macrotarsomys petteri. The specific name, petteri, honors French zoologist Francis Petter for his contributions to the study of Malagasy rodents. Petter's big-footed mouse, the largest species in the genus, is most similar to greater big-footed mouse, which may be its closest relative.

== Description ==
Petter's big-footed mouse is a terrestrial rodent with short forelimbs and long hindfeet. With a head and body length of 150 mm (5.9 in) and body mass of 105 g (3.7 oz) in the only known complete specimen, it is much larger than M. bastardi, and its measurements fall at or above the upper end of the known range of variation in M. ingens. The upperparts are covered with soft and short, brown fur. Most cover hairs (the main part of the fur) are dark brown for the two-thirds closest to the base, then light brown, with a short dark brown tip. The middle of the back appears darker, because the cover hairs there are entirely dark brown. The hairs are 6 to 8 mm (0.2 to 0.3 in) long on the shoulders and 7 to 9 mm (0.3 to 0.4 in) on the back. The guard hairs are gray. Because the flanks lack entirely dark cover hairs, they are slightly lighter than the rest of the upperparts. They are sharply separated in color from the underparts, which are entirely white to buffish. The mystacial vibrissae (whiskers above the mouth) are long, up to 60 mm (2.4 in), and white or black in color. The pinnae (external ears) are dark brown and covered with fine gray hairs, and ear length is 32 mm (1.3 in).

Hindfoot length is 37 mm (1.5 in). The upper sides of the feet are covered with grayish white fur, which extends around the claws to form ungual tufts. On the hindfeet, the fifth digit is relatively short at 6 mm (0.2 in); the hallux (first digit) is 8 mm (0.3 in) long, and the other digits 11 to 12 mm (0.4 to 0.5 in). The tail is 238 mm (9.4 in) long and naked in part. At the base, it is dark brown both above and below, but slightly lighter below. The upper side remains dark brown for much of its length, though the color does become lighter towards the tip. The lower side becomes mottled at about 55 mm (2.2 in) from the tip and then whitish at about 65 mm (2.6 in). It has a well-developed tuft at its tail tip, consisting of whitish and occasional light brown hairs. This tuft commences at about 130 mm (5.1 in) from the base with fairly short hairs and becomes more pronounced at 180 mm (7.1 in). In contrast, the greater big-footed mouse has a weaker, dark brown tuft.

Petter's big-footed mouse has a large and robust skull with well-developed zygomatic arches (cheekbones). The interorbital region of the skull (between the eyes) is smooth, as in greater big-footed mouse, and lacks the shelves characteristic of the bastard big-footed mouse. The palate is broad and the incisive foramina (openings in the front portion of the palate) are long and broad. In the mandible (lower jaw), the root of the lower incisor is housed in a distinct capsular process, a protuberance at the back of the jawbone. The lower masseteric ridge (a crest on the outer side of the mandible) is prominent. As is typical of Macrotarsomys, the molars are cuspidate and low-crowned.

== Distribution and ecology ==
The single known living specimen, a young adult male, was collected at 80 m (260 ft) altitude in the Andaladomo forest (part of the Mikea Forest) in 2003. The Andaladomo forest is different in vegetation from the rest of the Mikea Forest, and is similar to forests further to the north on Madagascar. The animal was found in an isolated fragment of dry deciduous forest amid land cleared for maize cultivation. The trap was set at the foot of a tree surrounded by bushes and succulent plants. Other small mammals known from the Mikea Forest include the bastard big-footed mouse, the introduced black rat (Rattus rattus), several species of tenrecs, and the shrew Suncus madagascariensis. Although only a single individual of Petter's big-footed mouse was caught during Goodman and Soarimalala's survey, which accrued 3100 trap-nights, they argue that this does not necessarily mean the species is rare, since trapping rates for rodents in the dry forests of Madagascar are often variable depending on year and season. Nothing is known of its behavior, but the animal's morphology suggests it lives on the ground.

Subsequent to its discovery at the Mikea Forest, Petter's big-footed mouse was also found as a subfossil in cave deposits at Andrahomana in far southeastern Madagascar, a find reported in 2006. There, it was found together with more abundant remains of the introduced black rat and house mouse (Mus musculus), as well as indigenous rodents such as the bastard big-footed mouse. Two Petter's big-footed mouse bones were radiocarbon dated to 790–410 BCE and 150–390 CE, respectively, a period when the local climate became drier and humans first appeared. Macrotarsomys species are thought to burrow in sandy ground and would not be expected to enter caves; therefore, the subfossils are probably remains of animals eaten by birds of prey. Although Petter's big-footed mouse could conceivably persist in remnant pockets of wet habitat in southeastern Madagascar, searches at two sites near Andrahomana failed to confirm its presence. It may have become locally extinct in the area because of the drying climate and competition with the black rat.

In 2009, it was also recorded from the cave of Ankilitelo in southwestern Madagascar. Remains of a large Macrotarsomys had previously been reported from other southern Madagascar sites, and at least some of these may be M. petteri. A karstic deposit near Lake Tsimanampetsotsa (dated to the Late Pliocene or Early Pleistocene on unclear grounds) contained three species of Macrotarsomys, including a very large one that may well be M. petteri. Remains identified as greater big-footed mouse have been reported from a cave at Ankazoabo in southern Madagascar; these may also be Petter's big-footed mouse.

== Conservation status ==
The IUCN Red List assesses Petter's big-footed mouse as "Data Deficient", but notes that the species will very probably qualify as threatened if its current distribution turns out to be restricted to primary forest in the Mikea Forest. The Mikea Forest is one of the largest remaining forests of southwestern Madagascar, but it is not protected and is threatened by logging, pasture, and conversion to agricultural land.

== Literature cited ==
- Garbutt, N. 2007. Mammals of Madagascar: A Complete Guide. A & C Black, 304 pp. ISBN 978-0-7136-7043-1
- Goodman, S.M. and Soarimalala, V. 2005. A new species of Macrotarsomys (Rodentia: Muridae: Nesomyinae) from southwestern Madagascar (subscription required). Proceedings of the Biological Society of Washington 118(2):450–464.
- Goodman, S.M., Vasey, N. and Burney, D.A. 2006. The subfossil occurrence and paleoecological implications of Macrotarsomys petteri (Rodentia: Nesomyidae) in extreme southeastern Madagascar (subscription required). Comptes Rendus Palevol 5:753–762
- Muldoon, K.M., De Blieux, D.D., Simons, E.L. and Chatrath, P.S. 2009. The subfossil occurrence and paleoecological significance of small mammals at Ankilitelo Cave, southwestern Madagascar (subscription required). Journal of Mammalogy 90(5):1111–1131.
