= White-tipped tufted-tailed rat =

Conservation status
- Endangered (IUCN 3.1)

Scientific classification
- Kingdom: Animalia
- Phylum: Chordata
- Class: Mammalia
- Order: Rodentia
- Family: Nesomyidae
- Genus: Eliurus
- Species: E. penicillatus

Binomial name
- Eliurus penicillatus Thomas, 1908
- White-tipped tufted-tailed rat range

Species of rodent

The white-tipped tufted-tailed rat (Eliurus penicillatus) is a rodent endemic to Madagascar. It is known from only two specimens, one collected from Ampitambe forest in 1895 or 1896 and the second in 2000. It is listed by the International Union for Conservation of Nature (IUCN) as an endangered species due to habitat loss.

== Taxonomy ==
The type specimen was collected in 1895 or 1896 and described by British zoologist Oldfield Thomas in 1908. It has been considered to be a specimen of Major's tufted-tailed rat (Eliurus majori) but new information confirmed the original identification. This species differs from E. majori by its white-tipped caudal tuft.

== Habitat and distribution ==
Little is known about the white-tipped tufted-tailed rat because it is known from only two specimens. The first was collected in 1895 or 1896 from the Ampitambe forest, near Ambositra in Fianarantsoa Province and a second 35 km (21.7 mi) north-east of Fandriana in the Fandriana–Marolambo corridor in 2000. Both specimens were collected from montane humid forest at an altitude ranging from 900 to 1,670 m (2,952.8 to 5,479.0 ft). It has not been found during surveys in areas to the north and south of its known range.

== Status ==
This species has not been recorded from protected areas. It is thought that it could be threatened by the fragmentation of its humid forest habitat to cultivated land, and it is possible that all species of the subfamily Nesomyinae suffer from a plague carried by introduced rodents. The International Union for Conservation of Nature has classified the conservation status of this rat as "endangered" because its area of habitation is thought to be less than 5,000 km^{2} (1,931 sq mi).
