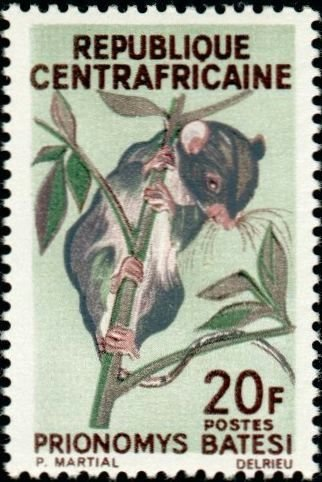
- Dollman's tree mouse on a stamp from Central African Republic

Conservation status
- Data Deficient (IUCN 3.1)

Scientific classification
- Kingdom: Animalia
- Phylum: Chordata
- Class: Mammalia
- Order: Rodentia
- Family: Nesomyidae
- Subfamily: Dendromurinae
- Genus: Prionomys; Dollman, 1910
- Species: P. batesi

Binomial name
- Prionomys batesi Dollman, 1910

= Dollman's tree mouse =

Species of rodent

Dollman's tree mouse (Prionomys batesi) is a poorly understood climbing mouse from central Africa. It is unique enough that it has been placed in a genus of its own, Prionomys, since its discovery in 1910.

== Distribution and habitat ==
Dollman's tree mouse has only been recorded in four localities in three countries. These are Bitye and Obala in Cameroon, La Maboké in Central African Republic, and Odzala in Republic of the Congo. In total only 23 specimens are known to be present in museums throughout the world.

Prionomys has a unique association with forest-savannah mosaics in central Africa. During interglacial periods, this region has undergone varying degrees of wet and dry periods. Savannah expands during dry periods and forest expands during wet periods, but there are small scale shifts in which regions are dry or wet. Prionomys appears to be associated with forest habitat on the edge of savannah patches. In particular, the species occurs as forest is recolonizing areas that were once savannah. Thus it is thought to be associated with younger, earlier successional forest but is no longer present in mature, late successional forest.

== Description and natural history ==
This is a rather small (head and body = 60 millimetres (2.4 in)) mouse with a fairly long (~100 mm) tail. The hair is short, soft, brown, and generally shrew-like. Ears are small and round. The upper incisors are narrow, ungrooved, orange, and short. The lower incisors project forward (proodont) and are sharply pointed.

The coronoid process on the mandible is reduced and that the animal appears to have the ability to push its lower jaw (and thereby its incisors) strongly forward. This suggests that Dollman's tree mouse uses this feature to dig its burrow with its lower incisors.

Prionomys appears to feed almost exclusively on certain species of ants, particularly Tetramorium aculeatum. This unusual diet may be part of the reason that so few individuals have been captured for study. Sherman live traps baited with vegetable-derived matter may not attract this species to the same degree that it does other small rodents. In many ways Prionomys is more shrew-like in its habits. Individuals have only been obtained in pitfall traps, captured by hand, or obtained from local hunters.

Dollman's tree mouse is nocturnal and arboreal. The naked tip of its tail might be prehensile.

== Relationships ==
As with many other mice historically referred to as the "dendromurines", the phylogenetic position of Prionomys is somewhat uncertain. There appears to be a close association between Prionomys and Dendroprionomys on the basis of molar structure. Their relationship may warrant a distinct tribe within the Dendromurinae, and while the retention of these two genera in the Dendromurinae seems reasonable, this may require further testing. The similarities between Prionomys and the deomyine Deomys may be due to convergence due to similar diet and habits.
