= Shortridge's rock mouse =

Conservation status
- Least Concern (IUCN 3.1)

Scientific classification
- Kingdom: Animalia
- Phylum: Chordata
- Class: Mammalia
- Order: Rodentia
- Family: Nesomyidae
- Genus: Petromyscus
- Species: P. shortridgei

Binomial name
- Petromyscus shortridgei Thomas, 1926

Species of rodent

Shortridge's rock mouse (Petromyscus shortridgei) is a species of rodent in the family Nesomyidae. It is found in Angola and Namibia. Its natural habitat is subtropical or tropical dry shrubland.
