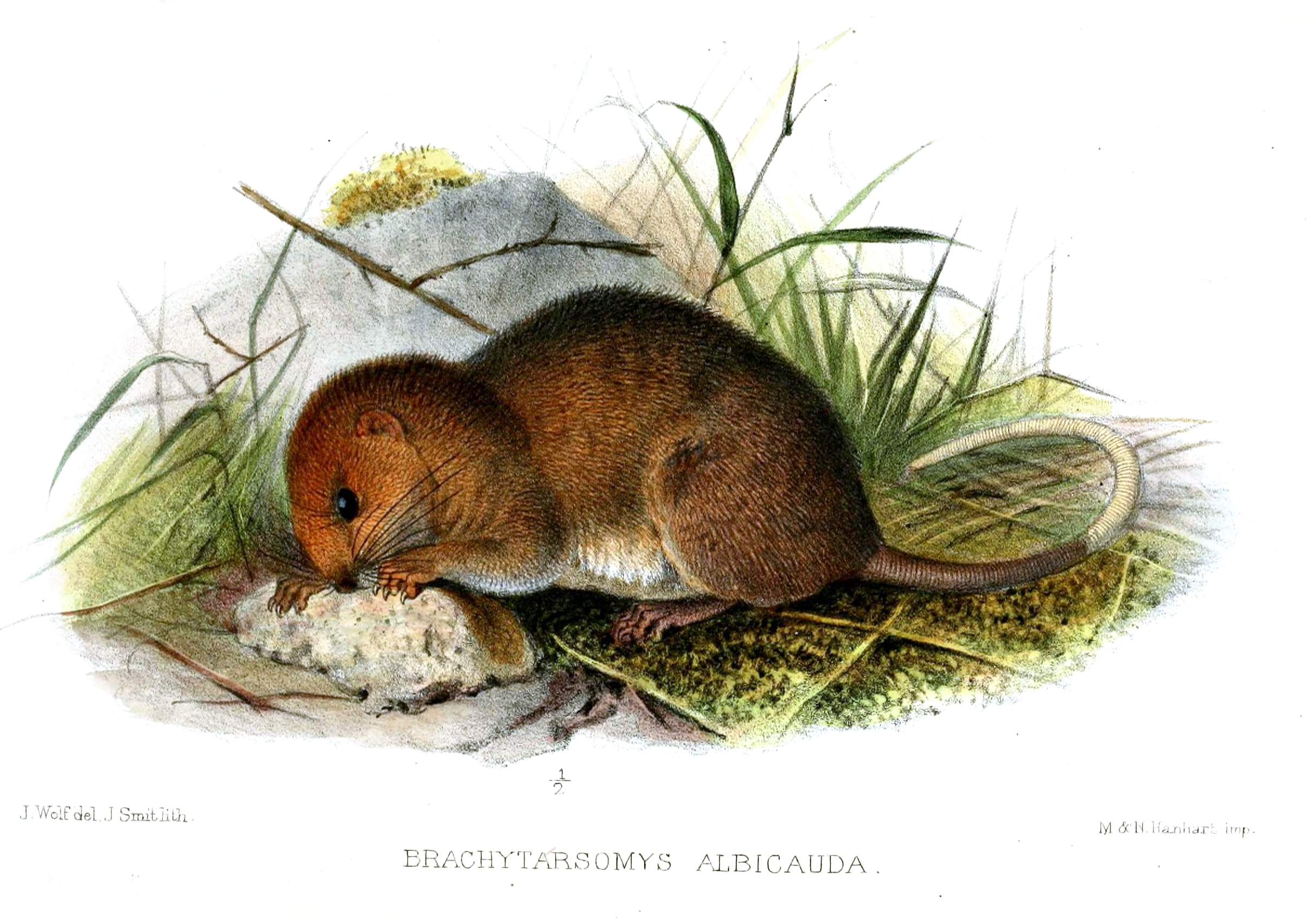
- White-tailed antsangy (Brachytarsomys albicauda)

Scientific classification
- Domain: Eukaryota
- Kingdom: Animalia
- Phylum: Chordata
- Class: Mammalia
- Order: Rodentia
- Family: Nesomyidae
- Subfamily: Nesomyinae
- Genus: Brachytarsomys; Günther, 1875

Species
- See text

= Brachytarsomys =

Brachytarsomys Temporal range: Pleistocene to Recent

Genus of rodents

Brachytarsomys is a genus of rodent in the family Nesomyidae. It contains the following species:

- White-tailed antsangy (Brachytarsomys albicauda)
- Brachytarsomys mahajambaensis (extinct)
- Hairy-tailed antsangy (Brachytarsomys villosa)
