= Delany's mouse =

Conservation status
- Vulnerable (IUCN 3.1)

Scientific classification
- Kingdom: Animalia
- Phylum: Chordata
- Class: Mammalia
- Order: Rodentia
- Family: Nesomyidae
- Subfamily: Delanymyinae; Musser and Carleton, 2005
- Genus: Delanymys; Hayman, 1962
- Species: D. brooksi

Binomial name
- Delanymys brooksi Hayman, 1962
- Geographic range

Species of rodent

Delany's mouse or Delany's swamp mouse (Delanymys brooksi) is a species of rodent in the family Nesomyidae. It is the only species in the genus Delanymys and the only extant member of subfamily Delanymyinae, which also contains the fossil genus Stenodontomys. It was previously placed in subfamily Petromyscinae, but it is apparently not closely related to Petromyscus. It is found in Democratic Republic of the Congo, Rwanda, and Uganda. Its natural habitats are subtropical or tropical high-altitude shrubland and swamps. It is threatened by habitat loss.

== Classification ==
In 2013, a robust muroid phylogeny found Delanymys sister to Mystromys + Petromyscus, reviving the affinity of Delanymys to petromyscines, in addition to Mystromys (Mystromyinae). Conventionally, all three genera have been placed in their own subfamily; a scheme that creates redundant, non-informative monogeneric subfamilies with respect to extant taxa.

More broadly, the clade Delanymys belongs to (Delanymys + (Mystromys + Petromyscus)) was sister to Dendromurinae (Steatomys + (Dendromus + Malacothrix)) and Cricetomyinae (Saccostomus + (Beamys + Cricetomys)).
