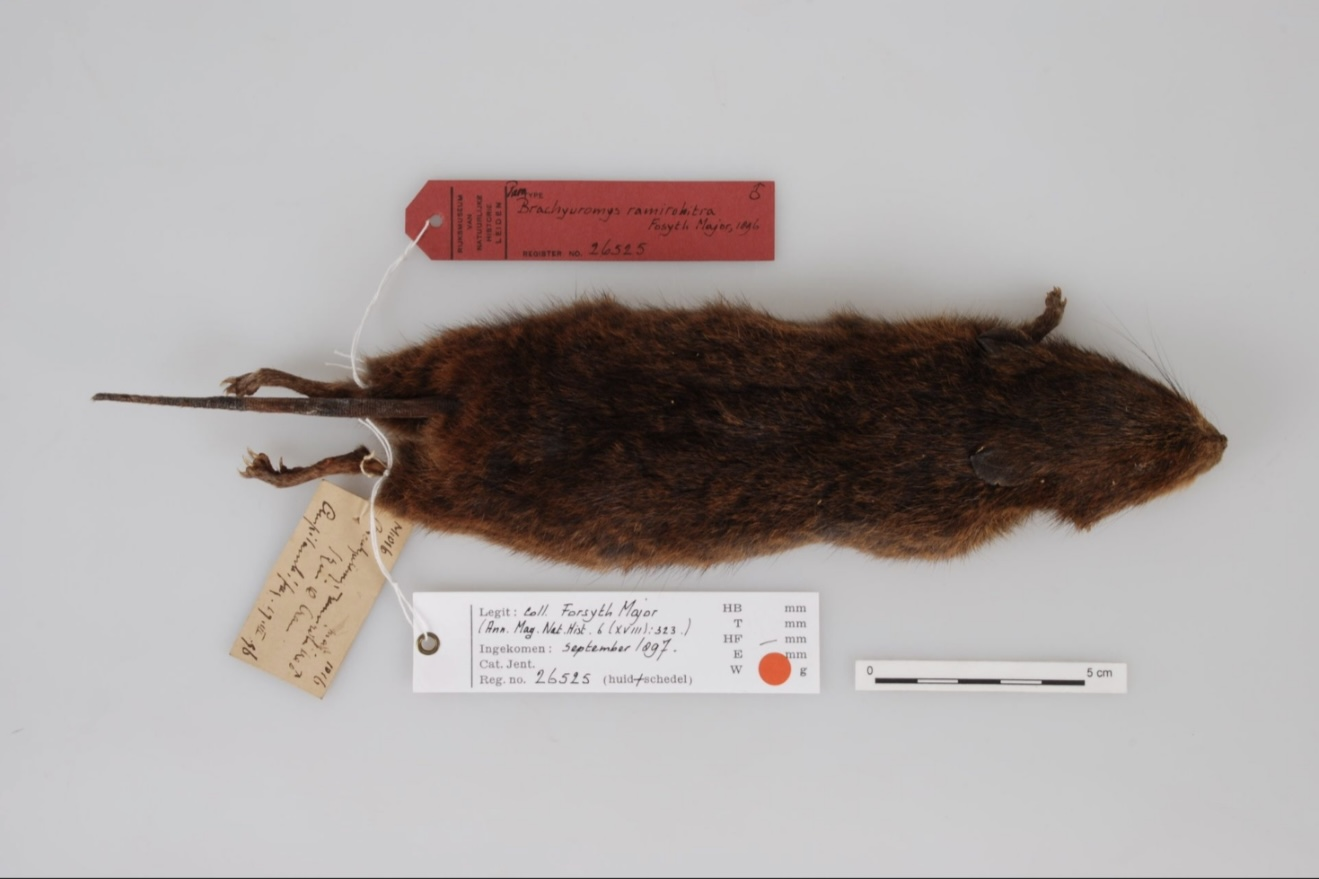
- Brachyuromys ramirohitra

Scientific classification
- Kingdom: Animalia
- Phylum: Chordata
- Class: Mammalia
- Order: Rodentia
- Family: Nesomyidae
- Subfamily: Nesomyinae
- Genus: Brachyuromys; Major, 1896

Species
- Brachyuromys betsileoensis Brachyuromys ramirohitra

= Brachyuromys =

Brachyuromys Temporal range: Recent (and controversial Late Miocene)

Genus of rodents

Brachyuromys is a genus of rodent in the family Nesomyidae. It contains the following species:

- Betsileo short-tailed rat (Brachyuromys betsileoensis)
- Gregarious short-tailed rat (Brachyuromys ramirohitra)
