= Nikolaus's mouse =

Conservation status
- Vulnerable (IUCN 3.1)

Scientific classification
- Kingdom: Animalia
- Phylum: Chordata
- Class: Mammalia
- Order: Rodentia
- Family: Nesomyidae
- Genus: Megadendromus; Dieterlan & Rupp, 1978
- Species: M. nikolausi

Binomial name
- Megadendromus nikolausi Deiterlen & Rupp, 1978

Species of rodent

Nikolaus's mouse (Megadendromus nikolausi) is a species of rodent in the family Nesomyidae. It is the only species in the genus Megadendromus. It is found only in Ethiopia. Its natural habitat is subtropical or tropical high-altitude shrubland. It is threatened by habitat loss.
