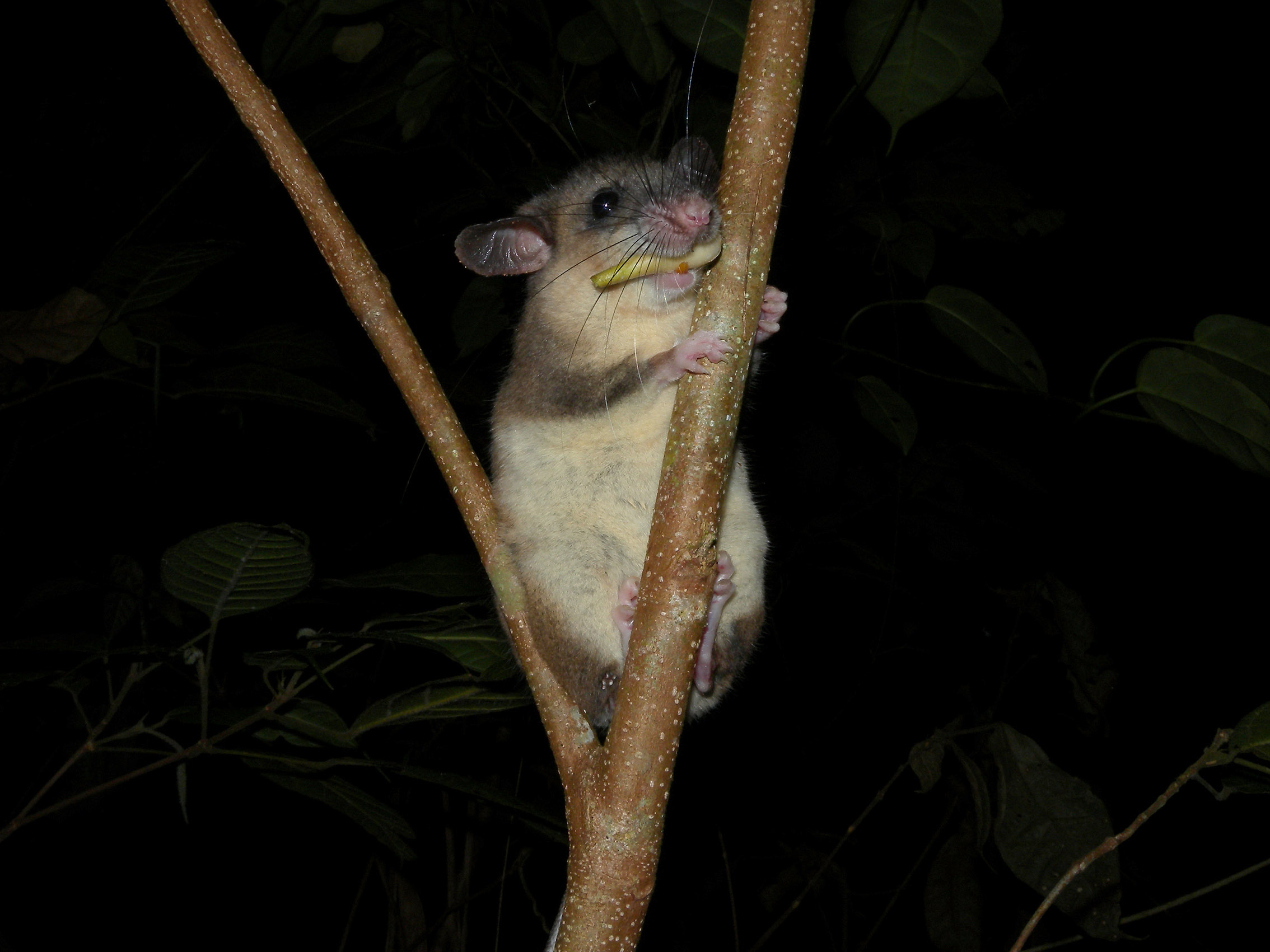
- Eliurus sp.

Scientific classification
- Domain: Eukaryota
- Kingdom: Animalia
- Phylum: Chordata
- Class: Mammalia
- Order: Rodentia
- Family: Nesomyidae
- Subfamily: Nesomyinae
- Genus: Eliurus; Milne-Edwards, 1885

Species
- Eliurus antsingy Eliurus carletoni Eliurus danieli Eliurus ellermani Eliurus grandidieri Eliurus majori Eliurus minor Eliurus myoxinus Eliurus penicillatus Eliurus petteri Eliurus tanala Eliurus webbi

= Eliurus =

Genus of rodents

Eliurus is a genus of rodent in the family Nesomyidae. It contains the following species:

- Tsingy tufted-tailed rat (Eliurus antsingy)
- Ankarana Special Reserve tufted-tailed rat (Eliurus carletoni)
- Daniel's tufted-tailed rat (Eliurus danieli)
- Ellerman's tufted-tailed rat (Eliurus ellermani)
- Grandidier's tufted-tailed rat (Eliurus grandidieri)
- Major's tufted-tailed rat (Eliurus majori)
- Lesser tufted-tailed rat (Eliurus minor)
- Dormouse tufted-tailed rat (Eliurus myoxinus)
- White-tipped tufted-tailed rat (Eliurus penicillatus)
- Petter's tufted-tailed rat (Eliurus petteri)
- Tanala tufted-tailed rat (Eliurus tanala)
- Webb's tufted-tailed rat (Eliurus webbi)
