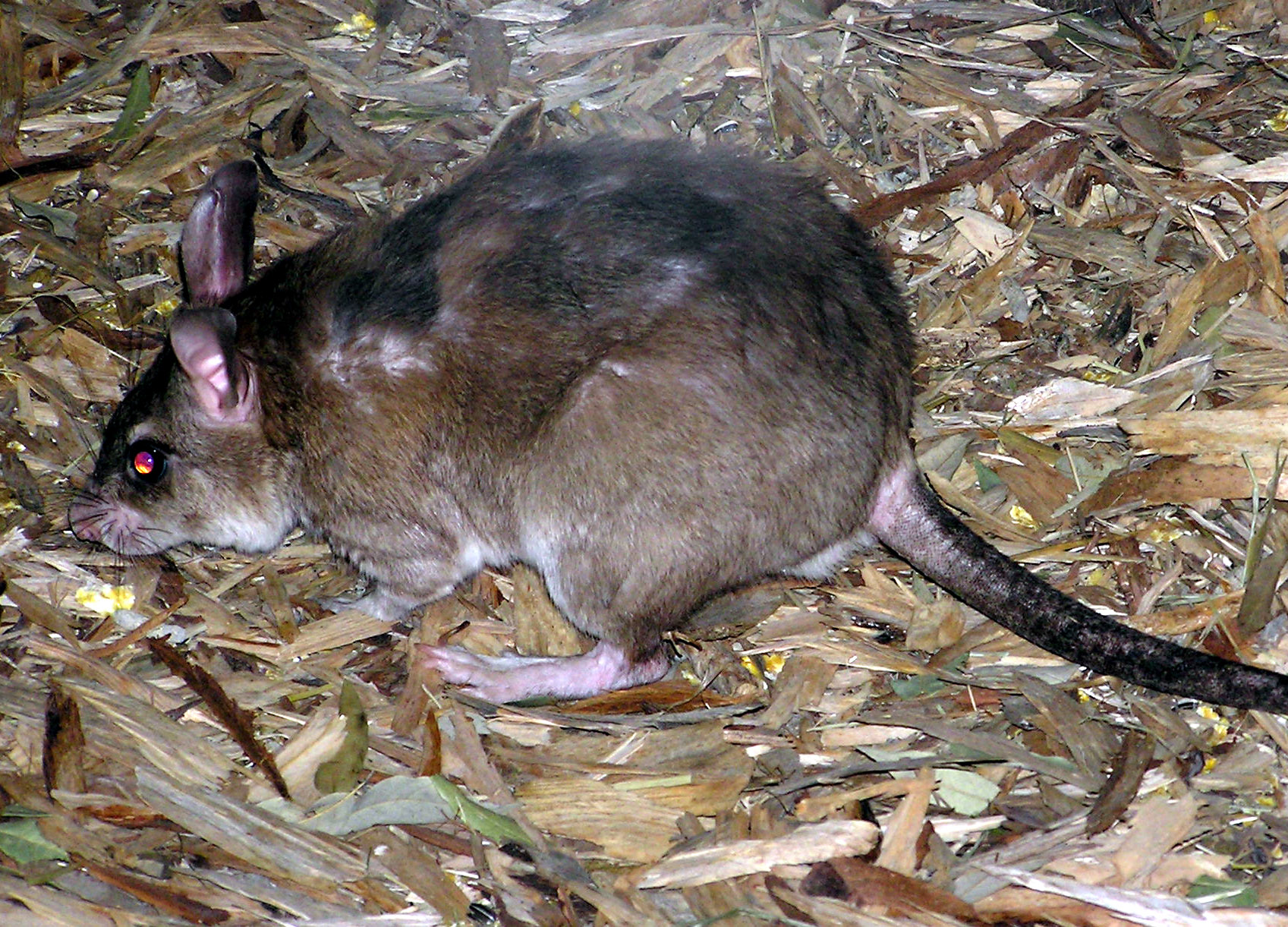

Scientific classification
- Kingdom: Animalia
- Phylum: Chordata
- Class: Mammalia
- Order: Rodentia
- Superfamily: Muroidea
- Family: Nesomyidae; Major, 1897

Type genus
- Nesomys Peters, 1870

Subfamilies
- Cricetomyinae; Delanymyinae; Dendromurinae; Mystromyinae; Nesomyinae; Petromyscinae
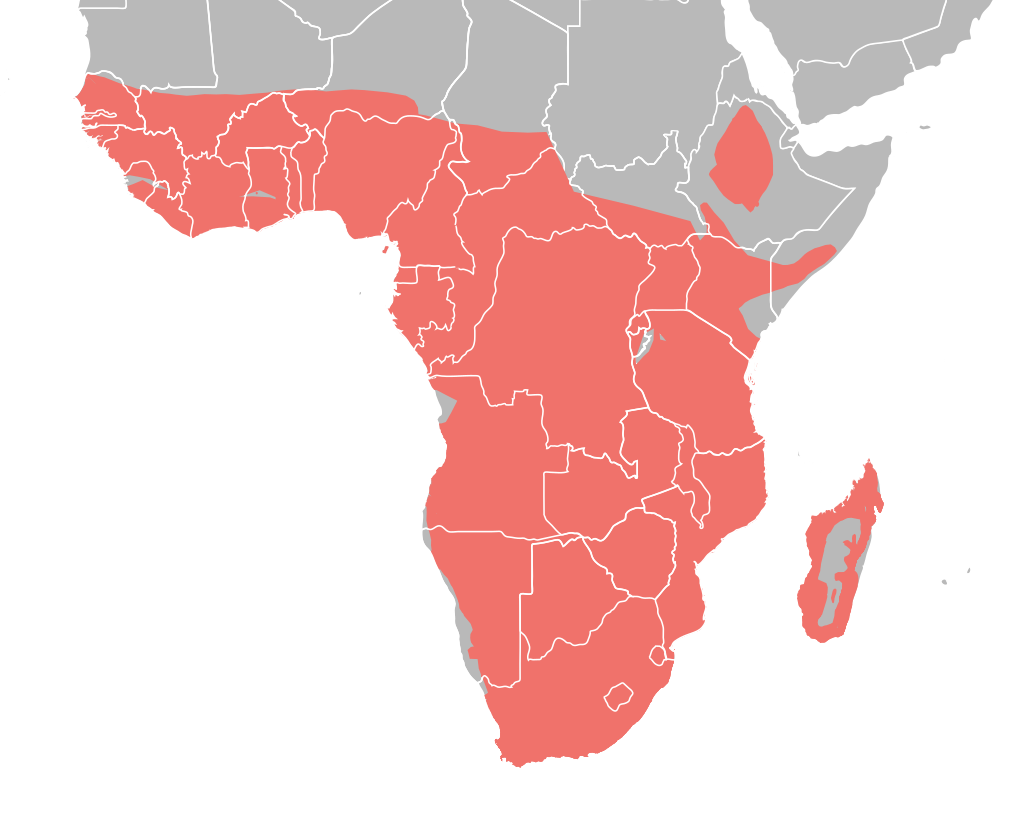
- Nesomyidae distribution

= Nesomyidae =

Nesomyidae Temporal range: Late Oligocene–Recent

Family of rodents

The Nesomyidae are a family of African rodents in the large and complex superfamily Muroidea. It includes several subfamilies, all of which are native to either continental Africa or to Madagascar. Included in this family are Malagasy rodents, climbing mice, African rock mice, swamp mice, pouched rats, and the white-tailed rat.

== Characteristics ==
Nesomyids are small- to medium-sized rodents, with the largest being the size of a rat. Physically, they may resemble mice, rats, voles, or hamsters, depending on the species and subfamily. Their diets vary from fairly strict herbivory to nearly pure insectivory. Their habits are similarly variable, with some species climbing trees, and others burrowing in the ground. They give birth to up to four young after a gestation period around six weeks.

== Classification ==
Many of these animals were once thought to be related to other groups of muroid rodents, but this African-based clade has been proposed and confirmed on the basis of genetic studies. Such alternate arrangement include the pouched rats in the family Muridae, and the white-tailed rat in the family Cricetidae. Likewise, all members of the Nesomyidae are often placed in the family Muridae along with all other members of the Muroidea.

Nesomyids are classified in six subfamilies, 21 genera, and 68 species.

FAMILY NESOMYIDAE

- Subfamily Cricetomyinae - pouched rats
  - Genus Beamys
    - Lesser hamster-rat, Beamys hindei
    - Greater hamster-rat, Beamys major
  - Genus Cricetomys - giant pouched rats
    - Southern giant pouched rat, Cricetomys ansorgei
    - Gambian pouched rat, Cricetomys gambianus
    - Emin's pouched rat, Cricetomys emini
    - Kivu giant pouched rat, Cricetomys kivuensis
  - Genus Saccostomus - pouched mice
    - South African pouched mouse, Saccostomus campestris
    - Mearns's pouched mouse, Saccostomus mearnsi
- Subfamily Delanymyinae
  - Genus Delanymys
    - Delany's mouse, Delanymys brooksi
- Subfamily Dendromurinae
  - Genus Dendromus - climbing mice
    - Remarkable climbing mouse, Dendromus insignis
    - Mount Kahuzi climbing mouse, Dendromus kahuziensis
    - Monard's African climbing mouse, Dendromus leucostomus
    - Lovat's climbing mouse, Dendromus lovati
    - Gray climbing mouse, Dendromus melanotis
    - Brants's climbing mouse, Dendromus mesomelas
    - Banana climbing mouse, Dendromus messorius
    - Chestnut climbing mouse, Dendromus mystacalis
    - Kivu climbing mouse, Dendromus nyasae (kivu)
    - Nyika climbing mouse, Dendromus nyikae
    - Cameroon climbing mouse, Dendromus oreas
    - Dendromus ruppi
    - Vernay's climbing mouse, Dendromus vernayi
  - Genus Megadendromus
    - Nikolaus's mouse, Megadendromus nikolausi
  - Genus Dendroprionomys
    - Velvet climbing mouse, Dendroprionomys rousseloti
  - Genus Prionomys
    - Dollman's climbing mouse, Prionomys batesi
  - Genus Malacothrix
    - Gerbil mouse, Malacothrix typica
  - Genus Steatomys - fat mice
    - Bocage's African fat mouse, Steatomys bocagei
    - Northwestern fat mouse, Steatomys caurinus
    - Dainty fat mouse, Steatomys cuppedius
    - Jackson's fat mouse, Steatomys jacksoni
    - Kreb's fat mouse, Steatomys krebsii
    - Pousargues's African fat mouse, Steatomys opimus
    - Tiny fat mouse, Steatomys parvus
    - Fat mouse, Steatomys pratensis
- Subfamily Mystromyinae
  - Genus Mystromys
    - White-tailed rat, Mystromys albicaudatus
- Subfamily Nesomyinae - Malagasy rodents
  - Genus Brachytarsomys - Malagasy white-tailed rats
    - White-tailed antsangy, Brachytarsomys albicauda
    - Hairy-tailed antsangy, Brachytarsomys villosa
  - Genus Brachyuromys - Malagasy short-tailed rats
    - Betsileo short-tailed rat, Brachyuromys betsileoensis
    - Gregarious short-tailed rat, Brachyuromys ramirohitra
  - Genus Eliurus - tufted-tailed rats
    - Tsingy tufted-tailed rat, Eliurus antsingy
    - Ankarana Special Reserve tufted-tailed rat, Eliurus carletoni
    - Ellerman's tufted-tailed rat, Eliurus ellermani
    - Daniel's tufted-tailed rat, Eliurus danieli
    - Grandidier's tufted-tailed rat, Eliurus grandidieri
    - Major's tufted-tailed rat, Eliurus majori
    - Lesser tufted-tailed rat, Eliurus minor
    - Dormouse tufted-tailed rat, Eliurus myoxinus
    - White-tipped tufted-tailed rat, Eliurus penicillatus
    - Petter's tufted-tailed rat, Eliurus petteri
    - Tanala tufted-tailed rat, Eliurus tanala
    - Webb's tufted-tailed rat, Eliurus webbi
  - Genus Gymnuromys
    - Voalavoanala, Gymnuromys roberti
  - Genus Hypogeomys
    - Votsovotsa (Malagasy giant rat), Hypogeomys antimena
  - Genus Macrotarsomys - big-footed mice
    - Bastard big-footed mouse, Macrotarsomys bastardi
    - Greater big-footed mouse, Macrotarsomys ingens
    - Petter's big-footed mouse, Macrotarsomys petteri
  - Genus Monticolomys
    - Malagasy mountain mouse, Monticolomys koopmani
  - Genus Nesomys
    - White-bellied nesomys, Nesomys audeberti
    - Western nesomys, Nesomys lambertoni
    - Island mouse, Nesomys rufus
  - Genus Voalavo
    - Eastern voalavo, Voalavo antsahabensis
    - Northern voalavo, Voalavo gymnocaudus
- Subfamily Petromyscinae - African rock mice
  - Genus Petromyscus
    - Barbour's rock mouse, Petromyscus barbouri
    - Pygmy rock mouse, Petromyscus collinus
    - Brukkaros pygmy rock mouse, Petromyscus monticularis
    - Shortridge's rock mouse, Petromyscus shortridgei
