= Hairy-tailed antsangy =

Conservation status
- Vulnerable (IUCN 3.1)

Scientific classification
- Kingdom: Animalia
- Phylum: Chordata
- Class: Mammalia
- Order: Rodentia
- Family: Nesomyidae
- Genus: Brachytarsomys
- Species: B. villosa

Binomial name
- Brachytarsomys villosa Petter, 1962
- Hairy-tailed Antsangy range

Species of rodent

The hairy-tailed antsangy (Brachytarsomys villosa) is a species of rodent in the family Nesomyidae. It is found only in Madagascar.
