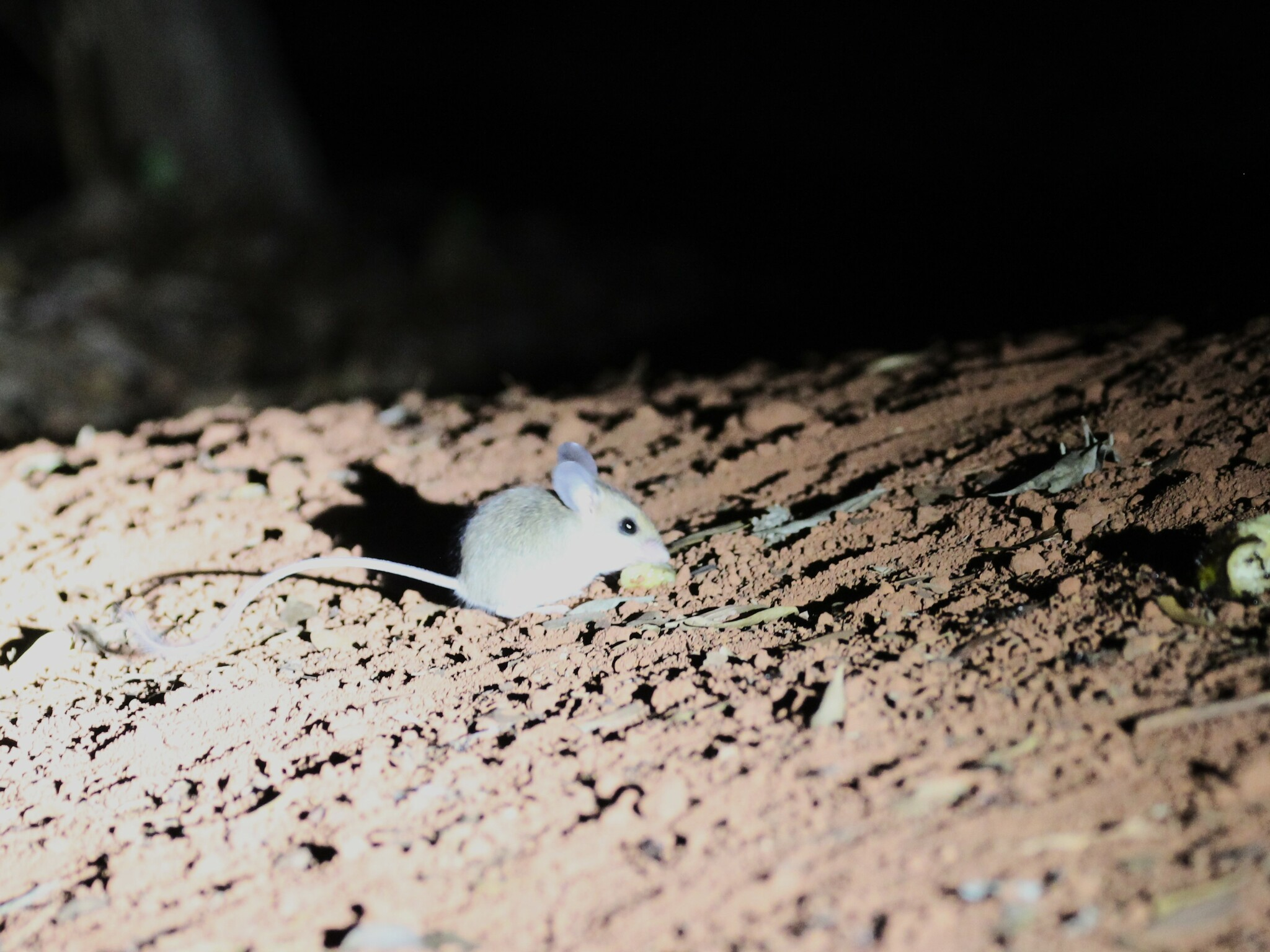
- Macrotarsomys bastardi

Scientific classification
- Kingdom: Animalia
- Phylum: Chordata
- Class: Mammalia
- Order: Rodentia
- Family: Nesomyidae
- Subfamily: Nesomyinae
- Genus: Macrotarsomys; Milne-Edwards & Grandidier, 1898

Species
- Macrotarsomys bastardi; Macrotarsomys ingens; Macrotarsomys petteri

= Big-footed mouse =

Big-footed mouse Temporal range: Pleistocene? to Recent

Genus of rodents

Big-footed mice (Macrotarsomys) are a genus of rodent in the family Nesomyidae. It contains the following species:

Genus Macrotarsomys - Big-footed mice

- Bastard big-footed mouse, Macrotarsomys bastardi Milne-Edwards and G. Grandidier, 1898
- Greater big-footed mouse, Macrotarsomys ingens Petter, 1959
- Petter's big-footed mouse, Macrotarsomys petteri Goodman and Soarimalala, 2005
