= Pousargues African fat mouse =

Pousargues's African fat mouse

Conservation status
- Least Concern (IUCN 3.1)

Scientific classification
- Kingdom: Animalia
- Phylum: Chordata
- Class: Mammalia
- Order: Rodentia
- Family: Nesomyidae
- Genus: Steatomys
- Species: S. opimus

Binomial name
- Steatomys opimus (Pousargues, 1894)

Species of rodent

Pousargues's African fat mouse (Steatomys opimus) is an extant species of rodent indigenous to the Central African Republic, Cameroon, and the Democratic Republic of the Congo. Given the distribution of the species throughout central Africa, the probability of a 'large population', and the security of its habitat, the International Union for Conservation of Nature (IUCN) recognises S. opimus as stable. Although the species is comparable in size to S. bocagei, the former exhibits an extra, abdominal pair of teats. In comparison to S. pratensis, S. opimus is significantly larger, while further comparison is necessary with S. jacksoni.
