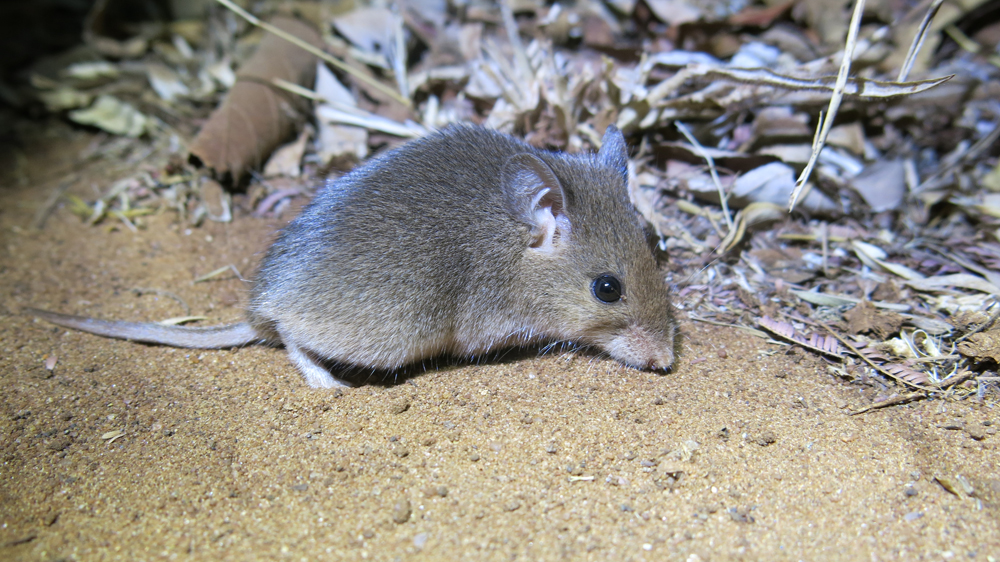
- Saccostomus campestris

Scientific classification
- Domain: Eukaryota
- Kingdom: Animalia
- Phylum: Chordata
- Class: Mammalia
- Order: Rodentia
- Family: Nesomyidae
- Subfamily: Cricetomyinae
- Genus: Saccostomus; Peters, 1846

Species
- Saccostomus campestris Saccostomus mearnsi

= Saccostomus =

Saccostomus Temporal range: Early Pliocene - recent

Genus of rodents

Saccostomus is a genus of rodent in the family Nesomyidae, or pouched mice. They have pouches in their cheeks. The genus contains the following species:

- South African pouched mouse (Saccostomus campestris)
- Mearns's pouched mouse (Saccostomus mearnsi)
