= Ellerman's tufted-tailed rat =

Conservation status
- Data Deficient (IUCN 3.1)

Scientific classification
- Kingdom: Animalia
- Phylum: Chordata
- Class: Mammalia
- Infraclass: Placentalia
- Order: Rodentia
- Family: Nesomyidae
- Genus: Eliurus
- Species: E. ellermani

Binomial name
- Eliurus ellermani Carleton, 1994
- Range of Eliurus ellermani

Species of rodent

Ellerman's tufted-tailed rat (Eliurus ellermani) is a species of rodent in the family Nesomyidae. It is endemic to eastern Madagascar. As only two specimens of this species have been observed, questions have been raised regarding whether this taxon is distinct from Eliurus tanala.
