= Monard's African climbing mouse =

Scientific classification
- Domain: Eukaryota
- Kingdom: Animalia
- Phylum: Chordata
- Class: Mammalia
- Order: Rodentia
- Family: Nesomyidae
- Genus: Dendromus
- Species: D. leucostomus

Binomial name
- Dendromus leucostomus Monard, 1933

Species of rodent

Monard's African climbing mouse (Dendromus leucostomus) is a species of rodent in the family Nesomyidae. It is endemic to east-central Angola, but only recorded in the type locality of Caluquembe. The IUCN red list of threatened species lists this as a synonym for the gray climbing mouse.
