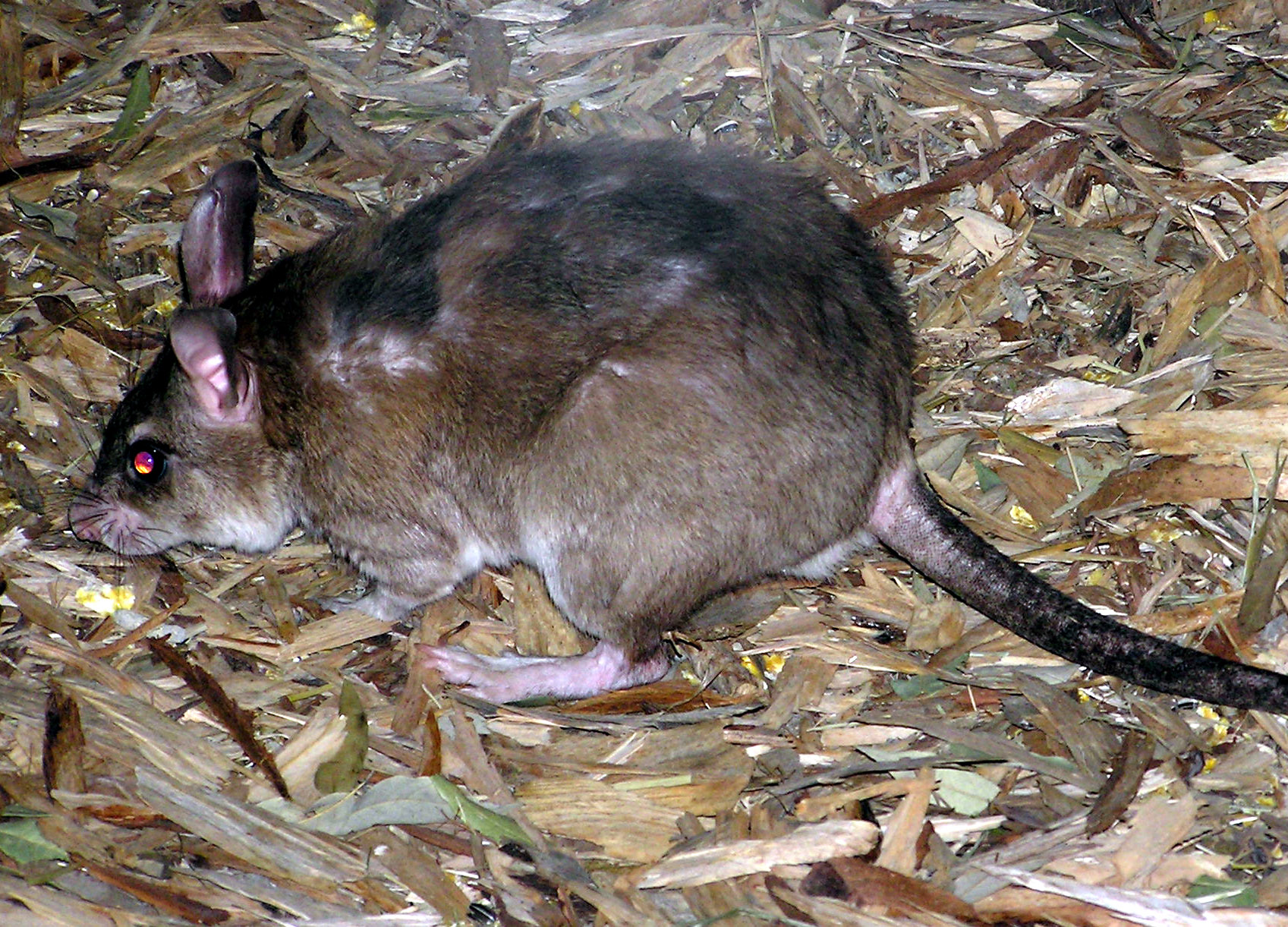
- Malagasy giant rat (Hypogeomys antimena)

Scientific classification
- Domain: Eukaryota
- Kingdom: Animalia
- Phylum: Chordata
- Class: Mammalia
- Order: Rodentia
- Family: Nesomyidae
- Subfamily: Nesomyinae
- Genus: Hypogeomys; A. Grandidier, 1869

= Hypogeomys =

Hypogeomys Temporal range: Early Pleistocene - Recent

Genus of rodents

Hypogeomys is a genus of rodents in the family Nesomyidae, found in Madagascar. There is one extant species, the Malagasy giant rat (Hypogeomys antimena), currently an endangered species with a restricted range. There is also another species known from subfossils from a few thousand years ago, Hypogeomys australis. H. antinema measures 33 centimetres (13 in), making it the largest rodent in Madagascar, while H. australis seems to have been slightly larger.
