= Velvet climbing mouse =

Conservation status
- Data Deficient (IUCN 3.1)

Scientific classification
- Domain: Eukaryota
- Kingdom: Animalia
- Phylum: Chordata
- Class: Mammalia
- Order: Rodentia
- Family: Nesomyidae
- Genus: Dendroprionomys; Petter, 1966
- Species: D. rousseloti

Binomial name
- Dendroprionomys rousseloti F. Petter, 1966

Species of rodent

The velvet climbing mouse (Dendroprionomys rousseloti) is a species of rodent in the family Nesomyidae. It is found only in Republic of the Congo.
