= Mount Kahuzi climbing mouse =

Conservation status
- Critically Endangered (IUCN 3.1)

Scientific classification
- Kingdom: Animalia
- Phylum: Chordata
- Class: Mammalia
- Order: Rodentia
- Family: Nesomyidae
- Genus: Dendromus
- Species: D. kahuziensis

Binomial name
- Dendromus kahuziensis Dieterlen, 1969

Species of rodent

The Mount Kahuzi climbing mouse (Dendromus kahuziensis) is a rodent found only in the Democratic Republic of the Congo. It is listed as a critically endangered species due to illegal logging; it is also threatened by fire. Only two specimens have ever been found. Both were found within 100 m (330 ft) of each other on Mount Kahuzi. Its body length (excluding tail) is 50–100 mm (2.0–3.9 in) and its tail length is 65–132 mm (2.6–5.2 in). Its habitat is tropical forests, and to navigate these forests it may use its semi-prehensile tail to hold on to tree branches. Its markings are brownish on the top and white to yellow on its underside, with strongly dark rings around its eyes. As with other Dendromus species, it has three well defined toes.
