= Betsileo short-tailed rat =

Conservation status
- Least Concern (IUCN 3.1)

Scientific classification
- Kingdom: Animalia
- Phylum: Chordata
- Class: Mammalia
- Order: Rodentia
- Family: Nesomyidae
- Genus: Brachyuromys
- Species: B. betsileoensis

Binomial name
- Brachyuromys betsileoensis (Bartlett, 1880)
- Betsileo short-tailed rat range

Species of rodent

The Betsileo short-tailed rat (Brachyuromys betsileoensis) is a species of rodent in the family Nesomyidae. It is found only in Madagascar. Its natural habitats are subtropical or tropical dry forests and subtropical or tropical dry shrubland.
