= Voalavoanala =

Conservation status
- Least Concern (IUCN 3.1)

Scientific classification
- Kingdom: Animalia
- Phylum: Chordata
- Class: Mammalia
- Order: Rodentia
- Family: Nesomyidae
- Genus: Gymnuromys; Major, 1896
- Species: G. roberti

Binomial name
- Gymnuromys roberti Major, 1896
- Voalavoanala range

Genus of rodents

The voalavoanala (Gymnuromys roberti) is a species of rodent in the family Nesomyidae.

== Distribution and habitat ==
It is the only species in the genus Gymnuromys. It is found only in Madagascar. Its natural habitat is tropical dry forests.
