= Grandidier's tufted-tailed rat =

Conservation status
- Least Concern (IUCN 3.1)

Scientific classification
- Kingdom: Animalia
- Phylum: Chordata
- Class: Mammalia
- Order: Rodentia
- Family: Nesomyidae
- Genus: Eliurus
- Species: E. grandidieri

Binomial name
- Eliurus grandidieri Carleton & Goodman, 1998
- 2011 range

Species of rodent

Grandidier's tufted-tailed rat (Eliurus grandidieri) is a species of rodent from the family Nesomyidae. Morphological evidence suggests that Grandidier's tufted-tailed rat is most closely related to Petter's tufted-tailed rat, E. petteri. However, Grandidier's tufted-tailed rat is the smaller of the two species.

== Distribution and range ==
Grandidier's tufted-tailed rat is endemic to Madagascar. It normally lives in middle to upper montane forests between the heights of 1,250 and 1,875 m (4,101 and 6,152 ft). It resides in both the Northern Highlands and the northern part of the Central Highlands in eastern Madagascar.

== Habitat and ecology ==
Grandidier's tufted-tailed rat is present in sclerophyllous forest and is presumed to be a partly scansorial species. The species is forest depended and has not been captured outside of forest or in alpine grasslands, though it may occur just below the tree line.

Female Grandidier's tufted-tailed rats are believed to give birth to up to three young.

== Conservation status ==
Grandidier's tufted-tailed rat is listed as Least Concern on the IUCN Red List due to its widely dispersed localities. The population trend of the species, however, is unknown. There is deforestation in the habitat of the Grandidier's tufted-tailed rat for conversion to cultivated land, but there is not enough population loss from this deforestation for the species to be listed as more threatened. There is sufficient evidence that all species from the family Nesomyidae, especially those that commonly live upwards of 800 m (2,600 ft), are susceptible to a 100 percent mortality rate from plagues carried by introduced rodents, and these seem to be localized events. The species is located in three protected areas: the Anjanaharibe-Sud and Manongarivo Special Reserves and the Marojejy National Park.
