= Greater big-footed mouse =

Conservation status
- Endangered (IUCN 3.1)

Scientific classification
- Kingdom: Animalia
- Phylum: Chordata
- Class: Mammalia
- Order: Rodentia
- Family: Nesomyidae
- Genus: Macrotarsomys
- Species: M. ingens

Binomial name
- Macrotarsomys ingens (Petter, 1959)
- Greater big-footed mouse range

Species of rodent

The greater big-footed mouse or long-tailed big-footed mouse (Macrotarsomys ingens) is a nocturnal rodent found only in north west Madagascar. It was first described by Francis Petter in 1959. It is listed as an endangered species as a result of habitat loss.

== Description ==
The greater big-footed mouse grows to a head and body length of up to 15 cm (6 in) with an even longer tail of up to 24 cm (9 in). Its weight is 50 to 60 grams (1.8 to 2.1 oz) and it has large eyes and large oval ears. Its big feet are adapted for climbing among the branches of trees. The pelage is brownish-fawn with a greyish undercoat; the underparts and legs are creamy white.

== Distribution and habitat ==
The greater big-footed mouse is found only in Mahajanga Province in north-western Madagascar, in the Ankarafantsika forest which is now part of the Ankarafantsika National Park. This is a low rainfall area with typical dry tropical vegetation. The mouse is a nocturnal species. It spends the day in a burrow in the forest floor, the entrance of which is concealed under a rock or tree root and spends the night scrambling about in bushes and trees looking for food.

== Biology ==
The greater big-footed mouse is believed to be herbivorous and probably eats berries, fruit, nuts, seeds, roots, and stems. It probably falls prey to such predators as snakes, birds and carnivorous mammals.

== Status ==
The greater big-footed mouse is listed as "Endangered" in the IUCN Red List of Threatened Species. This is because, although it is fairly common in the area in which it is found, its total range amounts to a single block of less than 5,000 square kilometres (1,900 sq mi). Its habitat is subject to degradation by fire and logging and the mouse is at risk of predation by feral animals.
