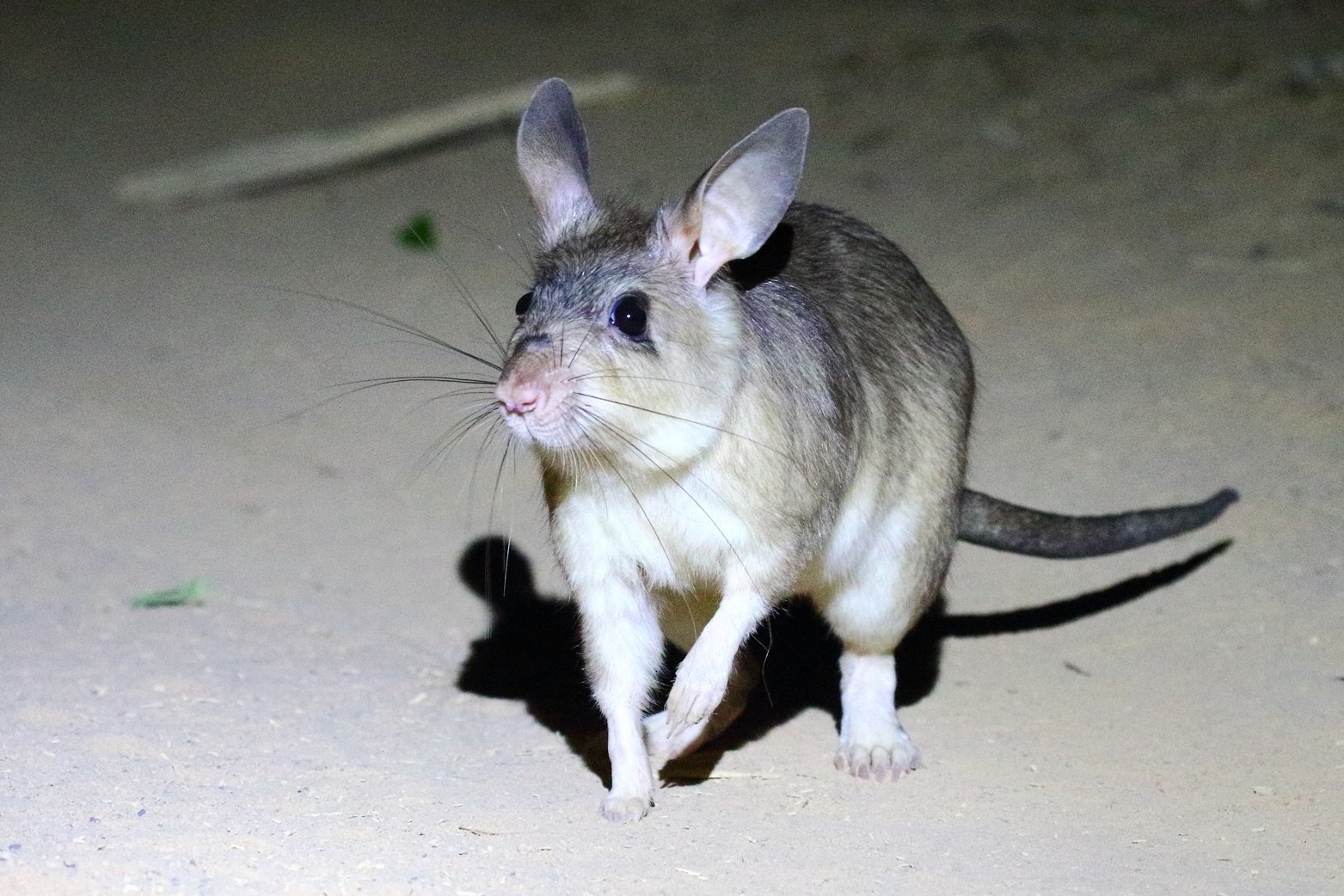
- Wild Malagasy giant rat at the Kirindy Forest Reserve, Madagascar

Conservation status
- Critically Endangered (IUCN 3.1)

Scientific classification
- Kingdom: Animalia
- Phylum: Chordata
- Class: Mammalia
- Order: Rodentia
- Family: Nesomyidae
- Genus: Hypogeomys
- Species: H. antimena

Binomial name
- Hypogeomys antimena A. Grandidier, 1869
- Malagasy giant rat range

= Malagasy giant rat =

Malagasy giant rat Temporal range: Holocene

Species of rodent

The Malagasy giant rat (Hypogeomys antimena), also known as the votsotsa or votsovotsa, is a nesomyid rodent found only in the Menabe region of Madagascar. It is a critically endangered species due to habitat loss, slow reproduction, and limited range (200 square kilometres north of Morondava, between the rivers Tomitsy and Tsiribihina) Pairs are monogamous and females bear only one or two young per year. It is the only extant species in the genus Hypogeomys; another species, Hypogeomys australis, is known from subfossil remains a few thousand years old.

== Physical description ==
Malagasy giant rats have an appearance somewhat similar to rabbits, though maintaining many rat-like features especially in the face. Males and females both grow to roughly rabbit-size, around 1.2 kg (2.6 lb) and 33 cm (13 in), though with an additional 20–25 cm (8–10 in) of dark tail. They have a coarse coat which varies from gray to brown to reddish, darkening around the head and fading to white on the belly. They also have prominent, pointed ears and long, muscular back legs, used for jumping to avoid predators. They can leap almost 3 ft (91 cm) in the air, for which reason they are sometimes called giant jumping rats.

== Reproduction and maturation ==
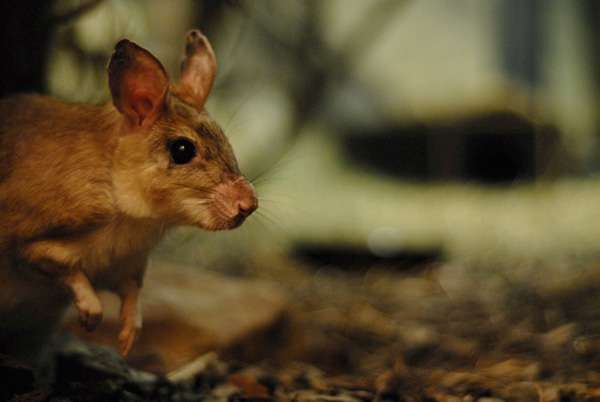
A Malagasy giant rat

The male Malagasy giant rat reaches sexual maturity within one year, but will not mate until reaching 1.5 to two years of age. The female Malagasy giant rat reaches sexual maturity in two years. These rats are one of the few rodent species to practice sexual monogamy. Once mated, a pair will stay together until one of them dies. On the death of a mate, females tend to remain in the burrow until a new male is found. While males usually wait for a new mate as well, they do occasionally move to live with a widowed female. Females give birth to a single offspring after a gestation of 102–138 days (number observed in captivity) once or twice during the mating season, which coincides with the Madagascar rainy season from December to April. The young are raised by both parents, remaining in the family burrow for the first 4–6 weeks, then increasingly exploring and foraging outside. Young males stay with the family unit for one year before achieving sexual maturity and leaving to find their own burrow. Females do not mature for two years and remain with their parents for the extra year. Males are extremely protective of their young. They are known to increase their own predation risk to follow or defend their offspring.

== Lifestyle and behavior ==
Completely nocturnal, the giant rats live in burrows up to 5 m (16 ft) across with as many as six entrances which, even those in regular use, are kept blocked by dirt and leaves to discourage predation by the Malagasy ground boa. The other main traditional predatory threat is the puma-like fossa but increasingly feral dogs and cats introduced to the island are hunting them as well. When foraging, the rats move on all fours, searching the forest floor for fallen fruit, nuts, seeds, and leaves. They have also been known to strip bark from trees and dig for roots and invertebrates. Pairs are highly territorial and the male and female will both defend their territory from other rats. They mark their territory with urine, feces, and scent gland secretions.

== Conservation and efforts ==
The Malagasy giant rat is listed as critically endangered. Limited range, habitat destruction, increased predation by non-native feral dogs and cats, and disease have all led to the decline. Many feral cats also carry a parasite called toxoplasmosis which causes rodents to lose their fear of cats, to the point of almost being attracted to cats, resulting in their being caught and killed more easily. Hantavirus is another rodent disease ravaging the population, which causes kidney failure.

The Madagascan Government has enacted laws to protect the giant rat. Much of their territory is now the Kirindy Forest Reserve where sustainable forestry is practiced. The government has also introduced policies that help the inhabitants of the island coexist with the animals that live there. Gerald Durrell was the first scientist to breed the rats in captivity. In 1990, he brought five specimens to Jersey. Since then, 16 breeding programs have been set up and 12 have been successful.
