= Ankarana Special Reserve tufted-tailed rat =

Conservation status
- Least Concern (IUCN 3.1)

Scientific classification
- Kingdom: Animalia
- Phylum: Chordata
- Class: Mammalia
- Order: Rodentia
- Family: Nesomyidae
- Genus: Eliurus
- Species: E. carletoni

Binomial name
- Eliurus carletoni Goodman, Raheriarisena & Jansa, 2009

Species of rodent

The Ankarana Special Reserve tufted-tailed rat (Eliurus carletoni) (synonymous with Eliurus sp. SAJ-2009a) is a species of rodent in the family Nesomyidae. It was first described in 2009. It is endemic to Madagascar, in the Ankarana Special Reserve.

== Distribution and morphology ==
Eliurus carletoni is a relatively new species restricted to Northern Madagascar. The species was named in honor of Dr. Michael Carleton of the National Museum of Natural History for his substantial influence in the study of rodent systematics and of rodents native to the island of Madagascar. Currently, E. carletoni is endemic to the Réserve Spéciale (RS) d’Ankarana. Madagascar is widely known for its unique biomes and biota. The genus Eliurus is part of the order Rodentia and the family Nesomyidae.

Eliurus carletoni can be characterized by the following: Overall, the texture of body hair is soft and fine. Cover hairs of the dorsum are bi-colored (proximal two-thirds is dark brown, and the distal one-third is a medium buff). The guard hairs, which have the primary role of protecting the rest of the pelage from abrasion and moisture, show characteristic colors of dark brown to black. The belly of E. carletoni is characteristically white. E. carletoni has a somewhat large cranium, a relatively short rostrum, moderately long molar rows, and a palatine process that is shorter and stouter in comparison to others within the genus. Likewise, the enamel of the anterior portion of the incisors is a dull yellow-orange color. E. carletoni exhibits a unicolor brown tail, which is also characteristic of others in the genus.

== Habitat ==
Members of the genus have been found to inhabit all the natural forest types on the island from humid forestation on the eastern side of the island to the xerophytic spiny bushes located in the southwest portion of the island. E. carletoni can be found specifically in the dry deciduous forests of Madagascar. Members of the species are known to inhabit forested areas resting on limestone outcrops. In Northern Madagascar, there are three regions of interest where E. carletoni live: the Loky-Manambato, Ankarana, and Analmerana.

Ankarana and Analamerana differ from Loky-Manambato in that they are solely areas of limestone. Loky-Manambato is highly heterogenous in its presence of large forested areas and many river systems. In fact, the Loky-Manambato region is so diverse in its make up that areas of dry forest and humid forest occur closely together only to be separated by mountains and rivers in some cases. The topographic distribution of the region includes elevations ranging from sea level up to 1170 meters. Though the Loky-Manambato region is very diverse, as previously stated, E. carletoni is found to only inhabit the dry forest areas.

== Reproduction and evolution ==
Little is known about the reproductive behavior and seasonality of E. carletoni. To this point, only a few observations have been made regarding these behaviors. We learn from a study done by Goodman et al. that in early January, some individuals can be found in reproductive condition while others are not. Some males show no scrotal testes while others show large scrotal testes and convoluted epididymides. Likewise, on another occasion in early April, one male was found in non-reproductive condition while another was found with partially scrotal testes and slightly convoluted epididymides. Within this same period, multiple females were found with large mammae all without embryos present, but one with placental scarring.

As we learn with many species, evolution can be driven by a variety of factors. For some, it is competition of various types, and for others, it is a matter of adapting to the changing climate. We learn in the case of E. carletoni that a bottleneck event occurred between 18,750 and 7,500 years ago, mainly due to the complexity within the Loky-Manambato region. Clearly, deforestation and other anthropogenic forest fragmenting will cause stress on a species to change. However, historical demographic analyses have proposed that the current genetic patterns we see in E. carletoni are occurring due to prehuman vegetational shifts because of the contraction and fragmentation of dry forests.
