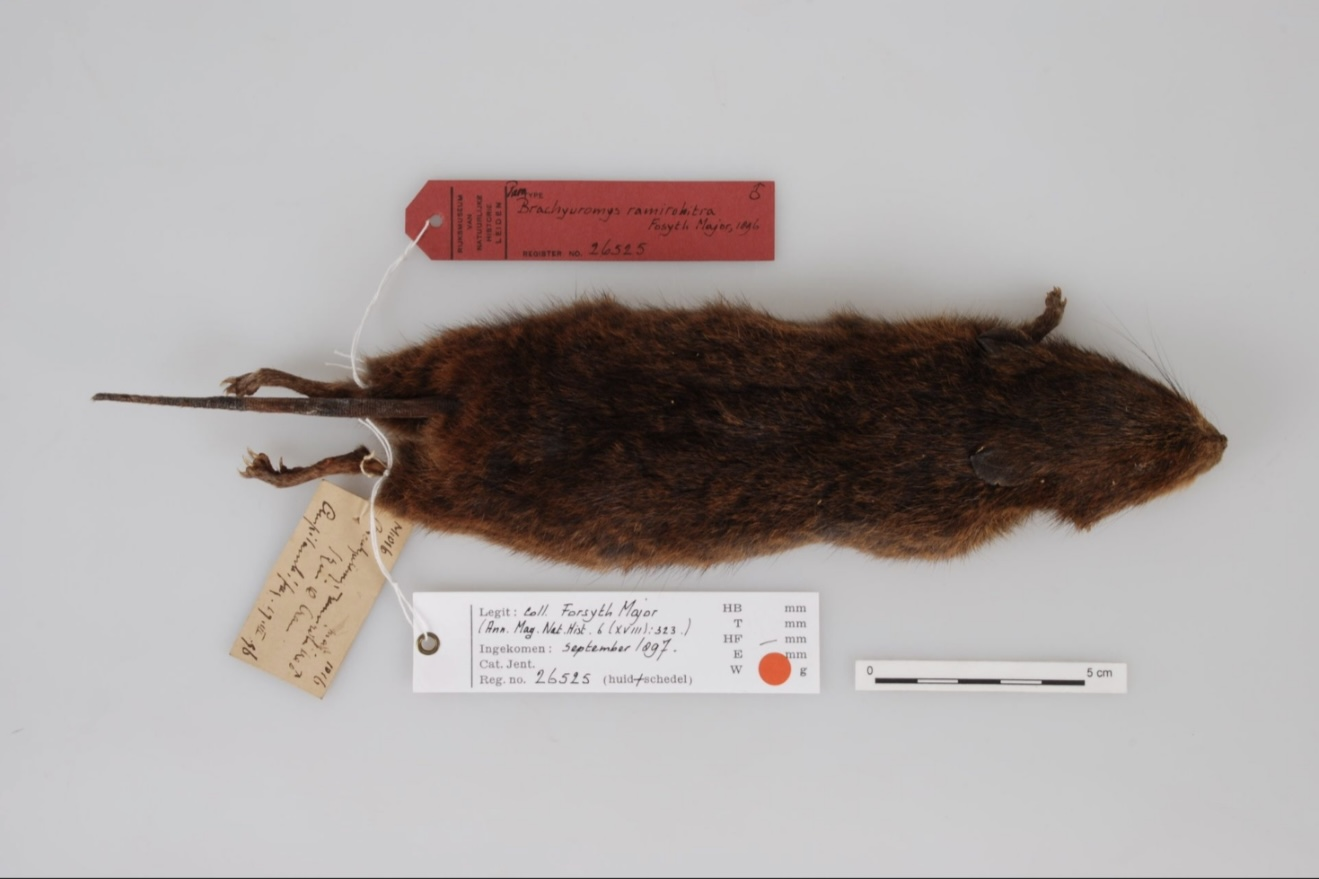

Conservation status
- Least Concern (IUCN 3.1)

Scientific classification
- Kingdom: Animalia
- Phylum: Chordata
- Class: Mammalia
- Order: Rodentia
- Family: Nesomyidae
- Genus: Brachyuromys
- Species: B. ramirohitra

Binomial name
- Brachyuromys ramirohitra Major, 1896
- Gregarious short-tailed rat range

= Gregarious short-tailed rat =

Species of rodent

The gregarious short-tailed rat (Brachyuromys ramirohitra) is a species of rodent in the family Nesomyidae. It is found only in Madagascar. Its natural habitats are subtropical or tropical dry forests and subtropical or tropical dry shrubland.
