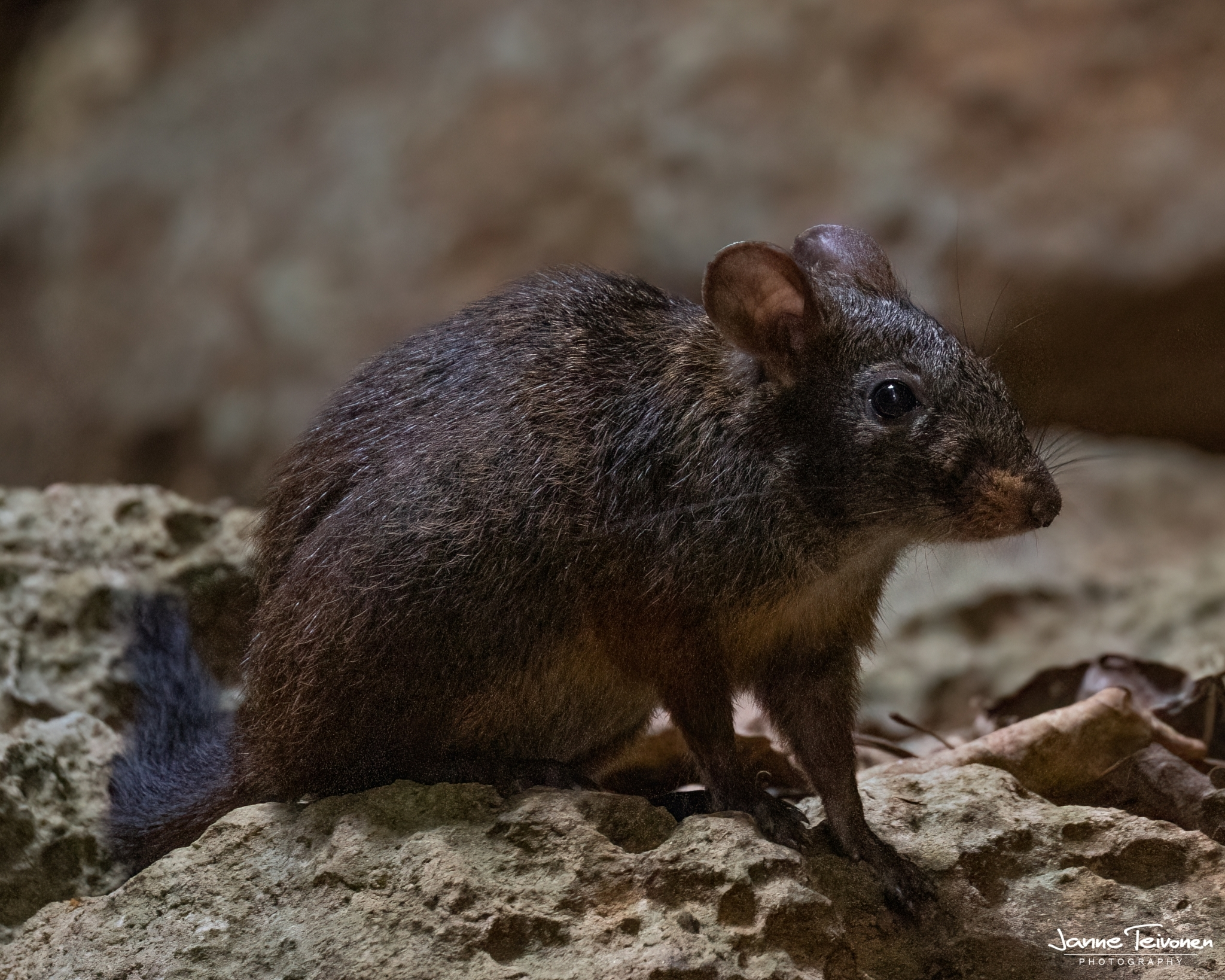

Conservation status
- Endangered (IUCN 3.1)

Scientific classification
- Kingdom: Animalia
- Phylum: Chordata
- Class: Mammalia
- Order: Rodentia
- Family: Nesomyidae
- Genus: Nesomys
- Species: N. lambertoni

Binomial name
- Nesomys lambertoni G. Grandidier, 1928

= Western nesomys =

Species of rodent

The western nesomys (Nesomys lambertoni), also known as the lowland red forest rat, is a species of rat endemic to Madagascar. They are suspected to reside within the nooks and crannies of the canyons of the Tsingy de Bemaraha National Park.
