= Gerbil mouse =

Gerbil mouse Temporal range: Late Pliocene to recent

Conservation status
- Least Concern (IUCN 3.1)

Scientific classification
- Kingdom: Animalia
- Phylum: Chordata
- Class: Mammalia
- Order: Rodentia
- Family: Nesomyidae
- Genus: Malacothrix; Wagner, 1843
- Species: M. typica

Binomial name
- Malacothrix typica (A. Smith, 1834)

Species of rodent

The gerbil mouse or long-eared mouse (Malacothrix typica) is a species of rodent in the family Nesomyidae. It is found in Angola, Botswana, Namibia, and South Africa. Its natural habitats are dry savanna, subtropical or tropical dry shrubland, hot deserts, and temperate deserts.
