= Mearns's pouched mouse =

Conservation status
- Least Concern (IUCN 3.1)

Scientific classification
- Kingdom: Animalia
- Phylum: Chordata
- Class: Mammalia
- Order: Rodentia
- Family: Nesomyidae
- Genus: Saccostomus
- Species: S. mearnsi

Binomial name
- Saccostomus mearnsi Heller, 1910

Species of rodent

Mearns's pouched mouse (Saccostomus mearnsi) is a species of rodent in the family Nesomyidae. It is found in Ethiopia, Kenya, Somalia, Tanzania, and Uganda. Its natural habitats are dry savanna, subtropical or tropical dry shrubland, hot deserts, and arable land.

Saccostomus mearnsi is prey for the olive hissing snake, Psammophis mossambicus, and is host for the fleas of the genus Xenopsylla. Saccostomus mearnsi competes with large mammals such as giraffes, elephants, and cattle, for grasses, which they both eat. For that reason, any declines in populations of large mammals lead to increased populations of Mearn's pouched mouse, which then lead to increased populations of snakes and fleas.
