= Webb's tufted-tailed rat =

Conservation status
- Least Concern (IUCN 3.1)

Scientific classification
- Kingdom: Animalia
- Phylum: Chordata
- Class: Mammalia
- Order: Rodentia
- Family: Nesomyidae
- Genus: Eliurus
- Species: E. webbi

Binomial name
- Eliurus webbi Ellerman, 1949
- Webb's tufted-tailed rat range

Species of rodent

Webb's tufted-tailed rat (Eliurus webbi) is a species of rodent in the family Nesomyidae. It is found only in Madagascar. Its natural habitat is subtropical or tropical dry forests. It is threatened by habitat loss.
