= Lesser tufted-tailed rat =

Conservation status
- Least Concern (IUCN 3.1)

Scientific classification
- Kingdom: Animalia
- Phylum: Chordata
- Class: Mammalia
- Order: Rodentia
- Family: Nesomyidae
- Genus: Eliurus
- Species: E. minor

Binomial name
- Eliurus minor Major, 1896
- Lesser tufted-tailed rat range

Species of rodent

The lesser tufted-tailed rat (Eliurus minor) is a species of rodent in the family Nesomyidae. It is found only in Madagascar.
