= Tsingy tufted-tailed rat =

Conservation status
- Data Deficient (IUCN 3.1)

Scientific classification
- Kingdom: Animalia
- Phylum: Chordata
- Class: Mammalia
- Order: Rodentia
- Family: Nesomyidae
- Genus: Eliurus
- Species: E. antsingy

Binomial name
- Eliurus antsingy Carleton, Goodman & Rakotondravony, 2001
- Range of Eliurus antsingy

Species of rodent

The Tsingy tufted-tailed rat (Eliurus antsingy) is a species of rodent in the family Nesomyidae. It is endemic to western and northern Madagascar, and has been observed mainly in dry forest. As a result of deforestation, the habitat of E. antsingy is at risk.
