= Major's tufted-tailed rat =

Conservation status
- Least Concern (IUCN 3.1)

Scientific classification
- Kingdom: Animalia
- Phylum: Chordata
- Class: Mammalia
- Order: Rodentia
- Family: Nesomyidae
- Genus: Eliurus
- Species: E. majori

Binomial name
- Eliurus majori Thomas, 1895
- Major's Tufted-tailed Rat range

Species of rodent

Major's tufted-tailed rat (Eliurus majori) is a species of rodent in the family Nesomyidae. It is found only in Madagascar. Its natural habitat is subtropical or tropical dry forests. It is threatened by habitat loss. The species was named in honor of Swiss zoologist C. I. Forsyth Major.
