= Tanala tufted-tailed rat =

Conservation status
- Least Concern (IUCN 3.1)

Scientific classification
- Kingdom: Animalia
- Phylum: Chordata
- Class: Mammalia
- Order: Rodentia
- Family: Nesomyidae
- Genus: Eliurus
- Species: E. tanala

Binomial name
- Eliurus tanala Major, 1896
- Tanala tufted-tailed rat range

Species of rodent

The Tanala tufted-tailed rat (Eliurus tanala) is a species of rodent in the family Nesomyidae. It is found only in Madagascar.
