= Francis Petter =

French zoologist (1923–2012)

- Born: Charles Francis Petter; 28 July 1923; 20th arrondissement of Paris
- Died: 21 January 2012 (aged 88); Conches-sur-Gondoire

Francis Petter, born on July 28, 1923, in Paris and died on January 21, 2012, in Conches-sur-Gondoire, was a French zoologist and the younger brother of Jean-Jacques Petter.

== Biography ==
Passionate about nature, Petter became a veterinarian while also completing his training as a naturalist at university. For a long time, he had been frequently visiting the Muséum national d'histoire naturelle, particularly its laboratory for Mammals and Birds. In 1949, he was appointed as an assistant to manage the mammalogy collections. Throughout his career at the museum, Petter dedicated himself to enriching the mammal collection and disseminating knowledge about nature, all while directing the journal Mammalia.

Through this, he gave a decisive impetus to the mammal collection, which grew by over 30,000 specimens in 40 years. Appointed as deputy director in 1961, he assembled a team of mammalogists with whom he studied the fauna of Madagascar and Central African Republic, then those of Brazil and French Guiana. Becoming increasingly systematic, he described new species of rodents and became the authority on difficult taxa.

Starting in 1965, Petter devoted himself to disseminating scientific knowledge to the general public and focused on renovating the Zoology Gallery that had been closed for safety reasons. With all his characteristic energy and alongside equally motivated individuals like Jean Dorst and Claude Lévi, he orchestrated the construction of the zoothèque—a vast reserve where most of the museum's collections of stuffed animals or those preserved through various methods were stored, including many types. He then led the committee of researchers within the Muséum who reflected on a theme to structure new presentations for the Zoology Gallery; it was thus that the theme of the Evolution of Species gradually emerged. During his retirement, Petter participated voluntarily in the "Cellule de Préfiguration" to reflect on museum planning for the renovation of the gallery into the Grande Galerie de l'Évolution. This project became one of the Grands Travaux de l’État starting in 1988. After the opening of the Grande Galerie de l'Évolution in 1994 and until his death, Petter continued to participate in numerous exhibitions as a scientific advisor.

An outstanding field expert, naturalist, zootechnician and systematician, Petter published over 150 articles and described twenty taxa. An undisputed specialist in the ecology of small Saharan mammals and the systematics of small murids in tropical regions, he was part of the team of animal specialists called upon by François de La Grange for his television show Les Animaux du Monde starting in 1969.

== Publications ==
=== Popular works ===
- Francis Petter, Les mammifères, Volume No. 1100 of the collection Que sais-je?, Presses Universitaires de France, Paris, 1963, 128 p.
- Francis Petter, Les animaux domestiques et leurs ancêtres, Bordas, Paris, 1973, 127 p. ISBN 2-04-007853-3
- Dominique & Francis Petter, Les Félins, Guide du jeune naturaliste, Delachaux et Niestlé, Lausanne, 1993, 78 p. ISBN 2-603-00907-9

=== Scientific works ===
Francis Petter published over 150 articles in scientific journals, including:

- Francis Petter, Répartition géographique et écologique des rongeurs désertiques de la région paléarctique, Mammalia, Paris, 1962.

A more complete list is available in the article "Hommage à Francis Petter.".
