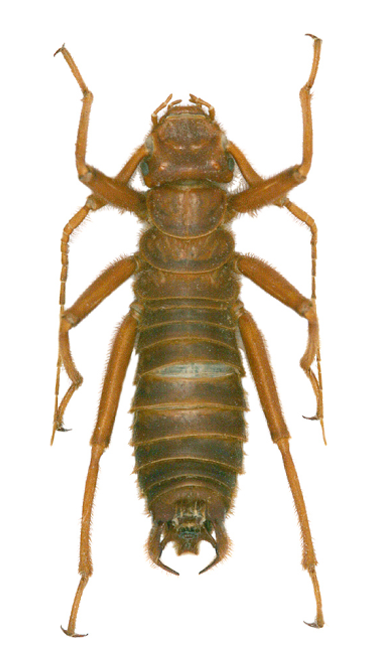

Scientific classification
- Kingdom: Animalia
- Phylum: Arthropoda
- Clade: Pancrustacea
- Class: Insecta
- Order: Dermaptera
- Family: Arixeniidae
- Genus: Arixenia
- Species: A. esau

Binomial name
- Arixenia esau Jordan 1909

= Arixenia esau =

Species of earwig

Arixenia esau is a species of earwig in the genus Arixenia (sister to Arixenia camura). It is in the family Arixeniidae, a group composed solely of commensalistic earwigs. Like most other species in Arixeniidae, A. esau is found in the tropics of Indonesia and Malaysia and has only been collected on the island of Borneo. The species is heavily associated with its host the hairless bat (Cheiromeles torquatus) and is most commonly collected from the fur of these bats and from caves inhabited by them. Arixenia esau is a rare species and has only been observed infrequently in its natural habitat.

== Description ==
This species was described by the entomologist Karl Jordan in 1909, when it was recorded as living within the brood pouches of hairless bats. Like the related species Xeniaria jacobsoni, A. esau females are much larger in size than the males. A. esau is easily contrasted from other members of the order Dermaptera by its minute cerci and full body covering of sensory hairs giving adults a mottled appearance.

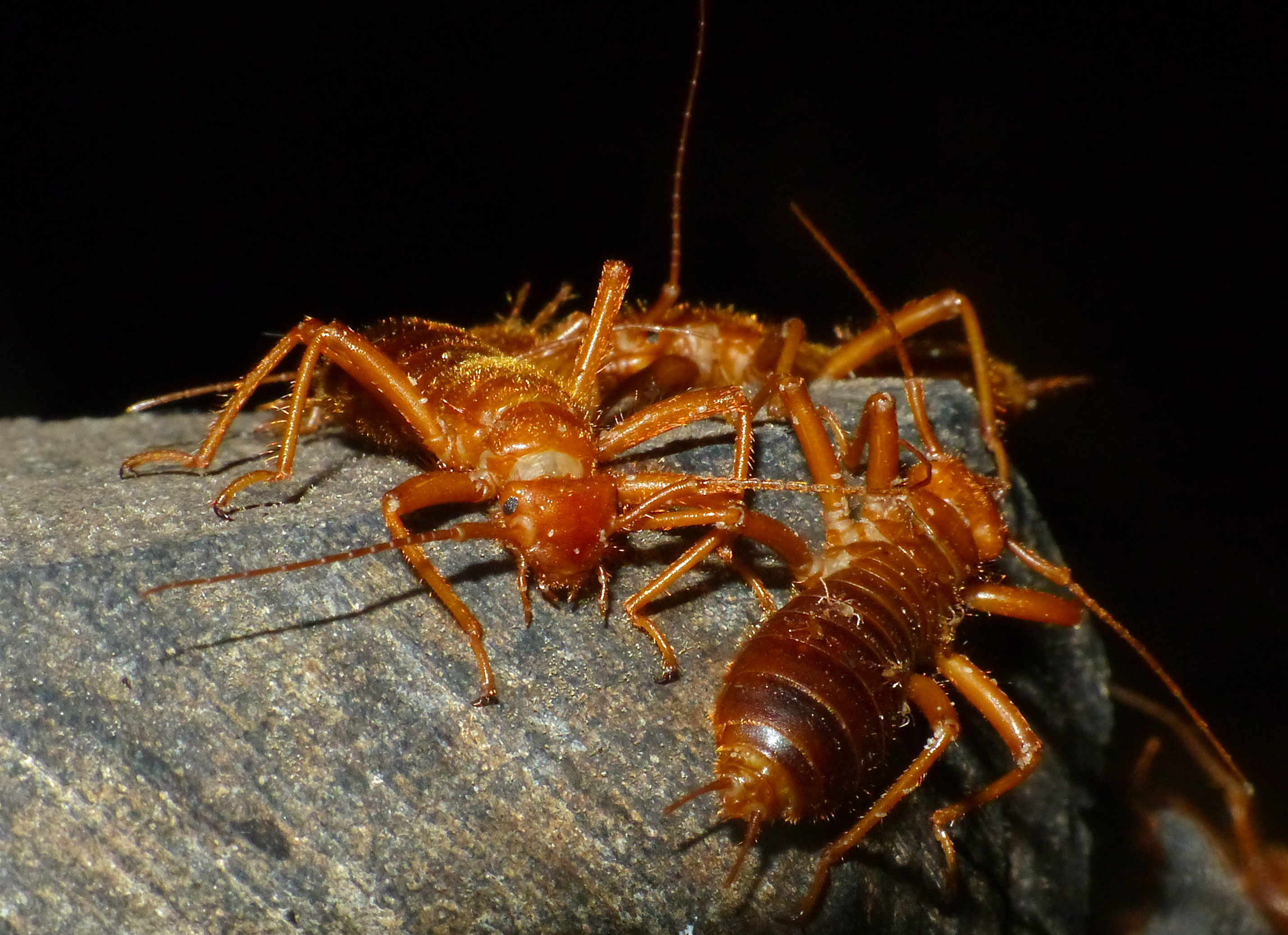
Live Arixenia esau specimens photographed in Borneo

Like all species in the Arixeniidae family, A. esau is wingless and blind. Nymphs and adults are a deep yellowish-brown color, although adults have darker abdominal tergites. The head is prognathous and heart-shaped, broad, and wide. The eyes are small and oval shaped, containing 50 to 65 facets in the males and between 60 and 90 in the females. Antennae have 14 segments and are inserted laterally on the head. Mouthparts are smaller than in other Arixeniidae species, the mandibles bearing 3 apical teeth with small maxilla. The pronotum of the thorax is curved posteriorly and exceeds the mesonotum significantly in length. The tarsal claws are well developed to enable gripping on the fur of hosts.

== Biology and life history ==
This species was originally described as ectoparasitic to its bat hosts, but this relationship has been revised and it is currently understood that the earwigs are not parasitic as they do not harm the bats in the process of feeding off of dead skin and bodily excretions. As the earwigs are blind and flightless, they spend their entire lives within the caves inhabited by their hosts.

Like some other earwig species Arixenia esau is viviparous, giving birth to live offspring that develop in a uterus. This feature has evolved twice within the Dermapteran order, in the groups Hemimeridae and Arixeniidae. Arixenia esau has a unique respiratory system to support larval development within the reproductive tract of the mother. An extensive tracheal system within the mother's body delivers oxygen through the respiratory pigment hemocyanin which is found in the fatty tissue of the larva while a placenta-like organ growing out of the larval abdomen mediates this gas exchange.

== Association with bat fleas ==
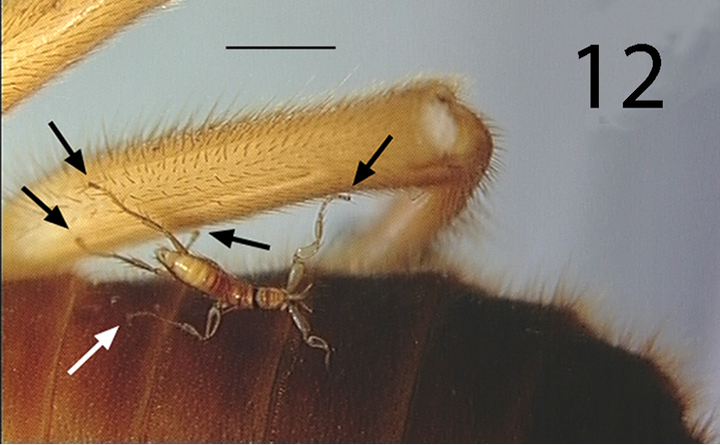
Lagaropsylla signata present on the leg of Arixenia esau

This species is associated with the bat fleas Lagaropsylla signata and Lagaropsylla turba, whose survival depends on easy access to hosts via riding on the earwig's body. This association is the only known example of a true phoreteic relationship between bat fleas and other insects. The hairs on the earwigs body make them ideal vectors for the fleas, who would otherwise remain trapped on the cave floors unable to reach the roosting bats.
