= Xeniaria truncata =

Scientific classification
- Kingdom: Animalia
- Phylum: Arthropoda
- Clade: Pancrustacea
- Class: Insecta
- Order: Dermaptera
- Family: Arixeniidae
- Genus: Xeniaria
- Species: X. truncata

Binomial name
- Xeniaria truncata Maa, 1974 in Nakata & Maa, 1974

Species of earwig

Xeniaria truncata is a species of earwigs (order Dermaptera) in the family Arixeniidae. It is endemic to the Philippines.

== Description ==
X. truncata is a wingless mid-sized earwig with a flat body; the body length of adult females is 18 mm (0.71 in). The body is almost entirely covered with hairs, with the head being an exception; the head does have a small patch of sensory hairs near the central portion, but is hairless outside of that. It is very similar to Xeniaria bicornis.

== Distribution ==
X. truncata is endemic to Palawan, the Philippines. It is associated with the hairless bat, Cheiromeles torquatus. The type series was obtained from the folds of foreneck of C. torquatus.
