= Araeomerus hubbardi =

Scientific classification
- Domain: Eukaryota
- Kingdom: Animalia
- Phylum: Arthropoda
- Class: Insecta
- Order: Dermaptera
- Family: Hemimeridae
- Genus: Araeomerus
- Species: A. hubbardi

Binomial name
- Araeomerus hubbardi Maa, 1974

Species of earwig

Araeomerus hubbardi is a species of earwigs, in the genus Araeomerus, family Hemimeridae and the order Dermaptera.
