= Araeomerus morrisi =

Scientific classification
- Domain: Eukaryota
- Kingdom: Animalia
- Phylum: Arthropoda
- Class: Insecta
- Order: Dermaptera
- Family: Hemimeridae
- Genus: Araeomerus
- Species: A. morrisi

Binomial name
- Araeomerus morrisi Hanney, 1963

Species of earwig

Araeomerus morrisi is a species of earwig, in the genus Araeomerus, family Hemimeridae.
