= Semenoviolidae =

Semenoviolidae Temporal range: Callovian–Oxfordian

Scientific classification
- Domain: Eukaryota
- Kingdom: Animalia
- Phylum: Arthropoda
- Class: Insecta
- Order: Dermaptera
- Suborder: †Eodermaptera
- Superfamily: †Semenovioloidea
- Family: †Semenoviolidae; Vishnyakova, 1980

Extinct family of earwigs

Semenoviolidae is an extinct family of earwigs in the order Dermaptera. There are at least two genera and two described species in Semenoviolidae.

== Genera ==
These two genera belong to the family Semenoviolidae:

- † Semenoviola Martynov, 1925
- † Semenovioloides Vishnyakova, 1980
