= Xeniaria =

Scientific classification
- Kingdom: Animalia
- Phylum: Arthropoda
- Clade: Pancrustacea
- Class: Insecta
- Order: Dermaptera
- Family: Arixeniidae
- Genus: Xeniaria; Maa, 1974

Species
- 3; see text

Genus of earwigs

Xeniaria is a genus of earwigs in the family Arixeniidae. The name is an anagram of Arixenia.

Xeniaria occur in Southeast Asia.

== Species ==
The genus includes the following three species:

- Xeniaria bicornis Maa, 1974
- Xeniaria jacobsoni (Burr, 1912)
- Xeniaria truncata Maa, 1974
