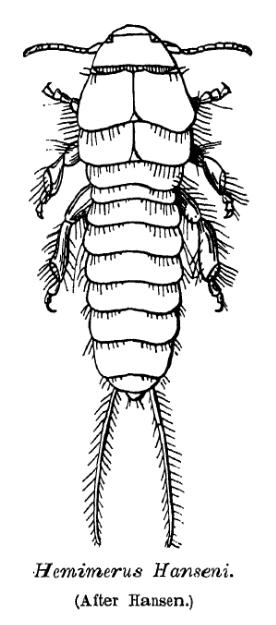

Scientific classification
- Domain: Eukaryota
- Kingdom: Animalia
- Phylum: Arthropoda
- Class: Insecta
- Order: Dermaptera
- Family: Hemimeridae
- Genus: Hemimerus
- Species: H. hanseni

Binomial name
- Hemimerus hanseni Sharp, 1895

= Hemimerus hanseni =

Species of earwig

Hemimerus hanseni is a species of earwig in the family Hemimeridae.

== See also ==
- List of species in the genus Hemimerus
