= Xeniaria bicornis =

Scientific classification
- Domain: Eukaryota
- Kingdom: Animalia
- Phylum: Arthropoda
- Class: Insecta
- Order: Dermaptera
- Family: Arixeniidae
- Genus: Xeniaria
- Species: X. bicornis

Binomial name
- Xeniaria bicornis Maa 1974

Species of earwig

Xeniaria bicornis is a species of earwigs, in the genus Xeniaria, family Arixeniidae and the order Dermaptera. It is one of three species in the genus Xeniaria.
