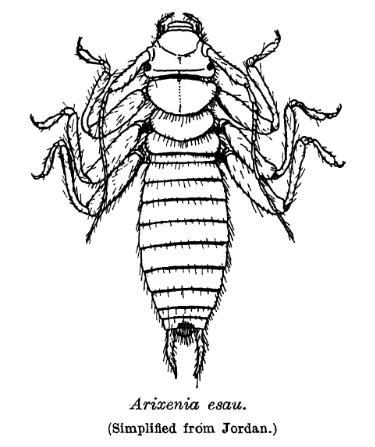
- Arixenia esau from the Manual of Entomology

Scientific classification
- Kingdom: Animalia
- Phylum: Arthropoda
- Clade: Pancrustacea
- Class: Insecta
- Order: Dermaptera
- Family: Arixeniidae
- Genus: Arixenia; Jordan, 1909

Species
- Arixenia camura; Arixenia esau

= Arixenia =

Genus of earwigs

Arixenia is a genus of earwigs, one of only two genera in the family Arixeniidae, and contains two species. These earwigs live on bats and feed off their dead skin, being commensalistic symbionts.

The genus Arixenia live on the skin of bats mainly of the genus Cheiromeles. Another genus Hemimerus is also ectoparasitic and found on rats of the genus Cricetomys. They are placed in the suborder Arixenina and have unsegmented cerci.
