= Kivu giant pouched rat =

Scientific classification
- Domain: Eukaryota
- Kingdom: Animalia
- Phylum: Chordata
- Class: Mammalia
- Order: Rodentia
- Family: Nesomyidae
- Genus: Cricetomys
- Species: C. kivuensis

Binomial name
- Cricetomys kivuensis Lönnberg, 1917

Species of rodent

The Kivu giant pouched rat (Cricetomys kivuensis) is a species of rodent in the family Nesomyidae.

== Taxonomy ==
It was formerly considered conspecific with the Emin's pouched rat (C. emini) but is now considered its own species.

== Distribution ==
It is found in central Africa, in the Democratic Republic of the Congo, Uganda, Rwanda, and Burundi.
