= A. camura =

A. camura may refer to:

An abbreviation of a species name. In binomial nomenclature the name of a species is always the name of the genus to which the species belongs, followed by the species name (also called the species epithet). In A. camura the genus name has been abbreviated to A. and the species has been spelled out in full. In a document that uses this abbreviation it should always be clear from the context which genus name has been abbreviated.

- Amphisbaena camura, a worm lizard species
- Arixenia camura, a species of earwig
