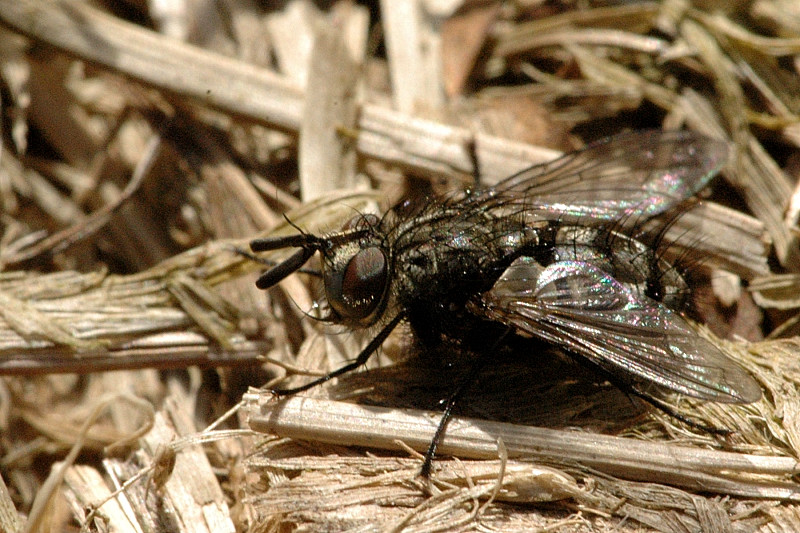
- Triarthria setipennis

Scientific classification
- Kingdom: Animalia
- Phylum: Arthropoda
- Class: Insecta
- Order: Diptera
- Family: Tachinidae
- Subfamily: Tachininae
- Tribe: Bigonichetini

= Bigonichetini =

Tribe of flies

Bigonichetini is a tribe of flies in the family Tachinidae. Some workers place members of this tribe in Loewiini.

== Genera ==
- Cucuba Richter, 2008
- Lissoglossa Villeneuve, 1913
- Triarthria Stephens, 1829
- Trichactia Stein, 1924
