= Cucuba =

Scientific classification
- Kingdom: Animalia
- Phylum: Arthropoda
- Class: Insecta
- Order: Diptera
- Family: Tachinidae
- Subfamily: Tachininae
- Tribe: Bigonichetini
- Genus: Cucuba; Richter, 2009

Type species
- Cucuba arenicola Richter, 2009

Genus of flies

Cucuba is a genus of flies in the family Tachinidae.

== Species ==
- Cucuba arenicola Richter, 2009

== Distribution ==
Turkmenistan
