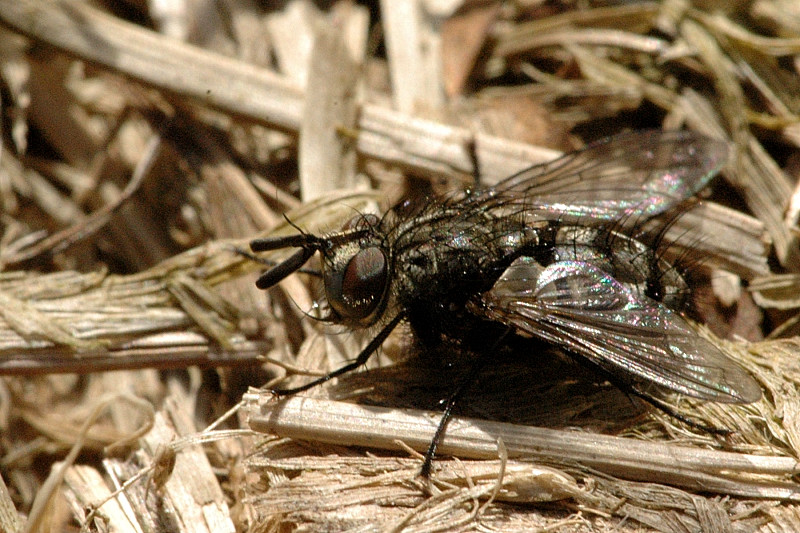

Scientific classification
- Kingdom: Animalia
- Phylum: Arthropoda
- Class: Insecta
- Order: Diptera
- Family: Tachinidae
- Subfamily: Tachininae
- Tribe: Bigonichetini
- Genus: Triarthria
- Species: T. setipennis

Binomial name
- Triarthria setipennis (Fallén, 1810)

Synonyms
- Tachina spinipennis Meigen, 1824; Tachina setipennis Fallén, 1810; Osmaea grisea Robineau-Desvoidy, 1830; Thryptocera zonata Meigen, 1838; Bigonicheta mariettii Rondani, 1845; Thryptocera ciliata Macquart, 1848; Metopia forficulae Newport, 1853; Stephania meridionalis Robineau-Desvoidy, 1863

= Triarthria setipennis =

Species of fly

Triarthria setipennis is a species of tachinid fly which parasitizes other insects, including earwigs.

== Distribution ==
Albania, Andorra, Belarus, Austria, Belgium, Bulgaria, Czech Republic, Denmark, Finland, France, Germany, Greece, Hungary, Italy, Lithuania, Norway, Poland, Romania, Russia, Slovakia, Spain, Sweden, Switzerland, Netherlands, Ukraine, United Kingdom.

It has been introduced from Europe in the 1920s to control Forficula auricularia (European earwig) and it is established in British Columbia, Washington, Oregon, California, Idaho, Nevada, Utah, Newfoundland, New Hampshire, Massachusetts.
