= Araeomerus =

Scientific classification
- Domain: Eukaryota
- Kingdom: Animalia
- Phylum: Arthropoda
- Class: Insecta
- Order: Dermaptera
- Family: Hemimeridae
- Genus: Araeomerus; Maa, 1974

Species
- Araeomerus hubbardi; Araeomerus morrisi

Genus of earwigs

Araeomerus is a genus of earwigs, in the family Hemimeridae and the order Dermaptera. It one of two genera in the family Hemimeridae, and contains two species.
