= Turanodermatidae =

Turanodermatidae Temporal range: Callovian–Oxfordian

Scientific classification
- Domain: Eukaryota
- Kingdom: Animalia
- Phylum: Arthropoda
- Class: Insecta
- Order: Dermaptera
- Suborder: †Eodermaptera
- Superfamily: †Semenovioloidea
- Family: †Turanodermatidae; Engel, 2003

Extinct family of earwigs

Turanodermatidae is an extinct family of earwigs in the order Dermaptera. There is one genus, Turanoderma, in Turanodermatidae.
