= Arixenia camura =

Scientific classification
- Domain: Eukaryota
- Kingdom: Animalia
- Phylum: Arthropoda
- Class: Insecta
- Order: Dermaptera
- Family: Arixeniidae
- Genus: Arixenia
- Species: A. camura

Binomial name
- Arixenia camura Maa, 1974

Species of earwig

Arixenia camura is a species of earwigs, one of two species in the genus Arixenia. Found in the hollows of trees but not in caves.
