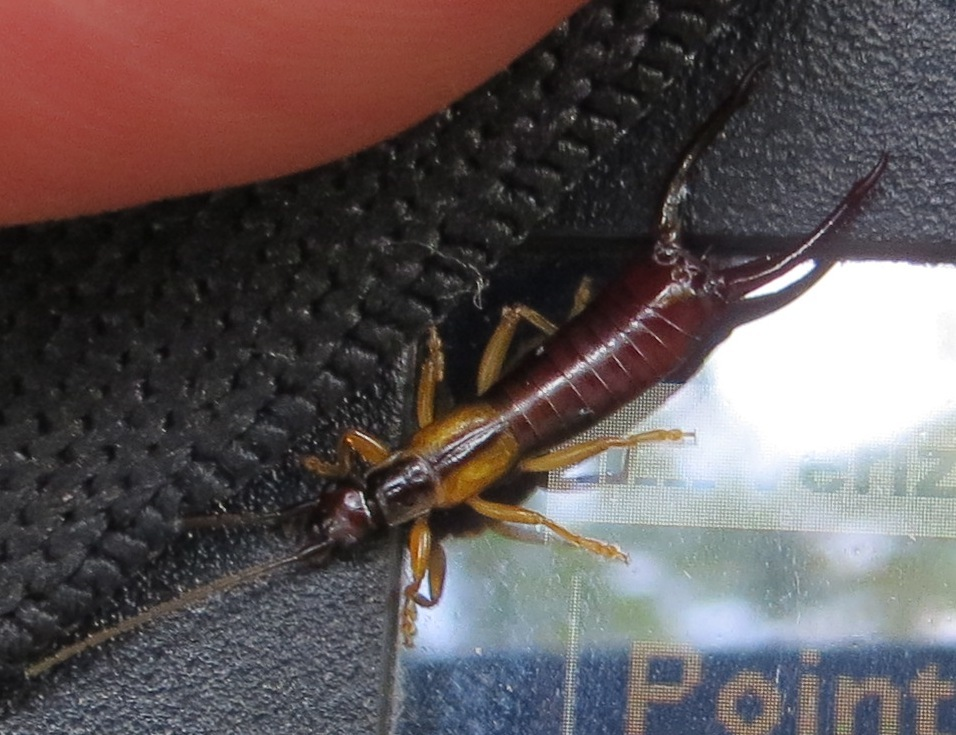

Scientific classification
- Kingdom: Animalia
- Phylum: Arthropoda
- Clade: Pancrustacea
- Class: Insecta
- Order: Dermaptera
- Family: Forficulidae
- Genus: Doru
- Species: D. aculeatum

Binomial name
- Doru aculeatum Scudder, 1876

= Doru aculeatum =

Species of earwig

Doru aculeatum, the spine-tailed earwig, is a species of earwig in the family Forficulidae. It is found in the woods and grassy areas of eastern North America and occurs at outdoor lights at night.

The adults have a brown body with pale markings. The male has a short thornlike spine in between the cerci on the 10th segment of the abdomen.

It is the only native species of earwig in the north of the United States and is found as far north as Canada, where it hides in the leaf axils of emerging plants in southern Ontario wetlands.

== Description ==
As given in W.S. Blatchley's Orthoptera of Northeastern America - with especial reference to the Faunas of Indiana and Florida (1920):

Dark chesnut brown; palpi, legs, edges of pronotum and outer two-thirds of tegmina yellow. Pronotum longer than broad, narrower than head. Tegmina nearly twice as long as pronotum, truncate; inner wings usually aborted. Forceps of male, three-fourths as long as abdomen slender, curved, bent down ward a little at basal third, becoming again horizontal a little before the tip, a pointed tooth present at second bend; of female shorter than those of male, their legs nearly straight, the lower inner edges very finely crenulate and usually contiguous for most of their length, the tips incurved. Length of body, ♂, 8-11, ♀, 7.5-10; of tegmina, ♂ and ♀, 2.5-3: of forceps, ♂, 4.7-6, ♀, 3-3.5; of pygidial spine, ♂, .8-1 mm.

== External resources ==
- Image of male Doru aculeatum showing the median spine on bugguide.net.
