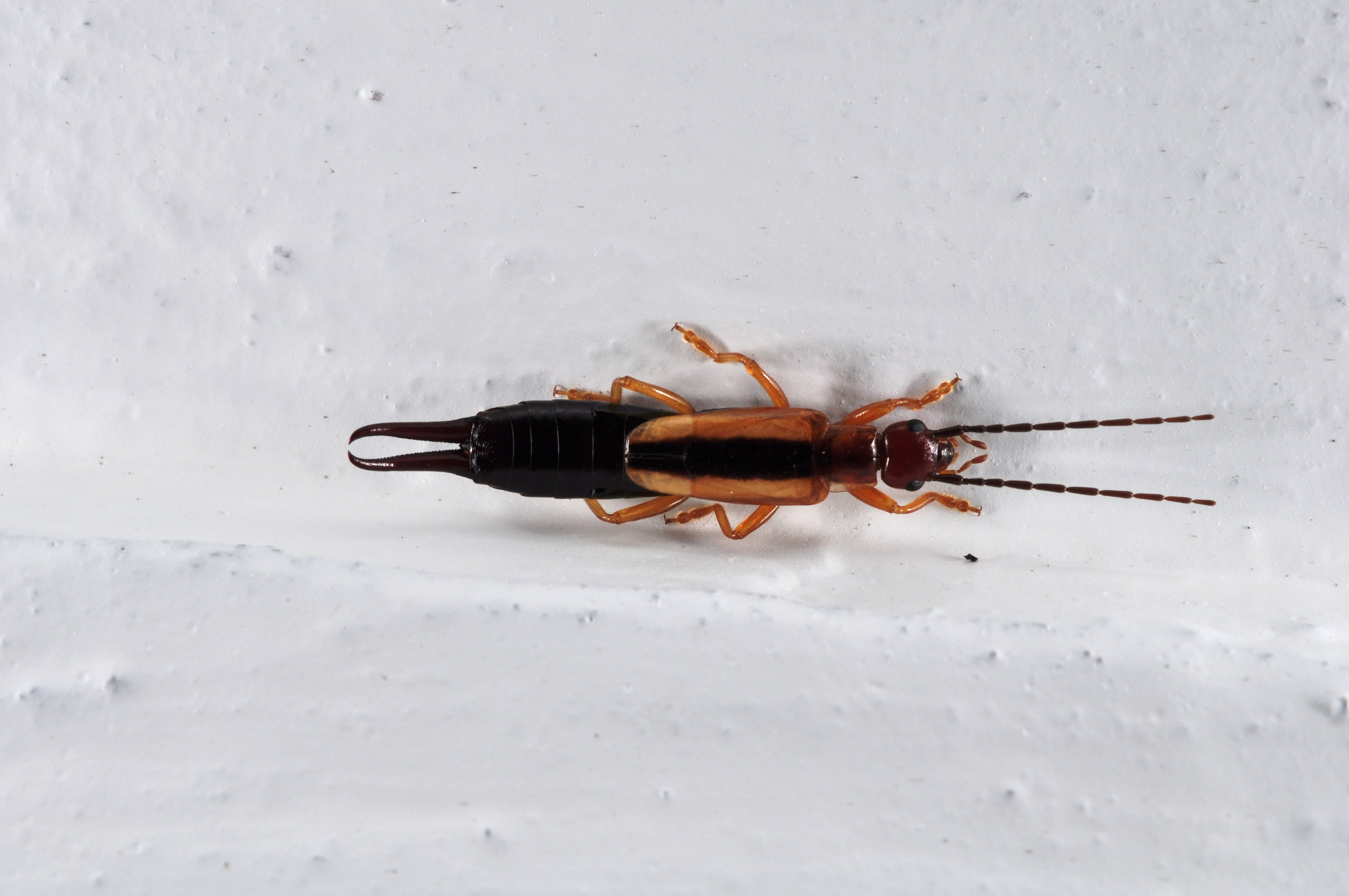
- Doru taeniatum

Scientific classification
- Domain: Eukaryota
- Kingdom: Animalia
- Phylum: Arthropoda
- Class: Insecta
- Order: Dermaptera
- Family: Forficulidae
- Subfamily: Forficulinae
- Genus: Doru

Species
- See text

= Doru (earwig) =

Genus of earwigs

Doru is a genus of earwigs in the family Forficulidae.

== Description ==
Doru can be recognised by having yellow elytra with a black suture.

According to the original description by Malcom Burr, the third and fourth antennal segments are subequal. The elytra are not carinate. The abdomen is subparallel and depressed in shape. The anal segment of the abdomen is transverse, depressed and not sloping. The pygidium is spinous or sharp. In males, the arms of the forceps are slender, removed from the base and not expanded.

== Ecology ==
In North America, these earwigs can be found on grasses and sedges, usually near water.

== Species ==
These 16 species belong to the genus Doru:

- Doru aculeatum (Scudder, 1876)^{i c g b} (spine-tailed earwig)
- Doru albipes (Fabricius, 1787)^{c g}
- Doru beybienkoi Steinmann, 1979^{c g}
- Doru cincinnatoi Machado, 1967^{c g}
- Doru davisi Rehn and Hebard, 1914^{i c g}
- Doru dohrni Steinmann, 1979^{c g}
- Doru gracilis (Burmeister, 1838)^{c g}
- Doru leucopteryx Burr, 1912^{c g}
- Doru lineare (Eschscholtz, 1822)^{i c g}
- Doru luteipes (Scudder, 1876)^{c g}
- Doru platensis Borelli, 1912^{c g}
- Doru robustum Brindle, 1971^{c g}
- Doru spiculiferum (Kirby, WF, 1891)^{c g}
- Doru taeniatum (Dohrn, 1862)^{i c g b} (lined earwig)
- Doru turbator Steinmann, 1979^{c g}
- Doru unicolor Brindle, 1971^{c g}

Data sources: i = ITIS, c = Catalogue of Life, g = GBIF, b = Bugguide.net

== Gallery ==
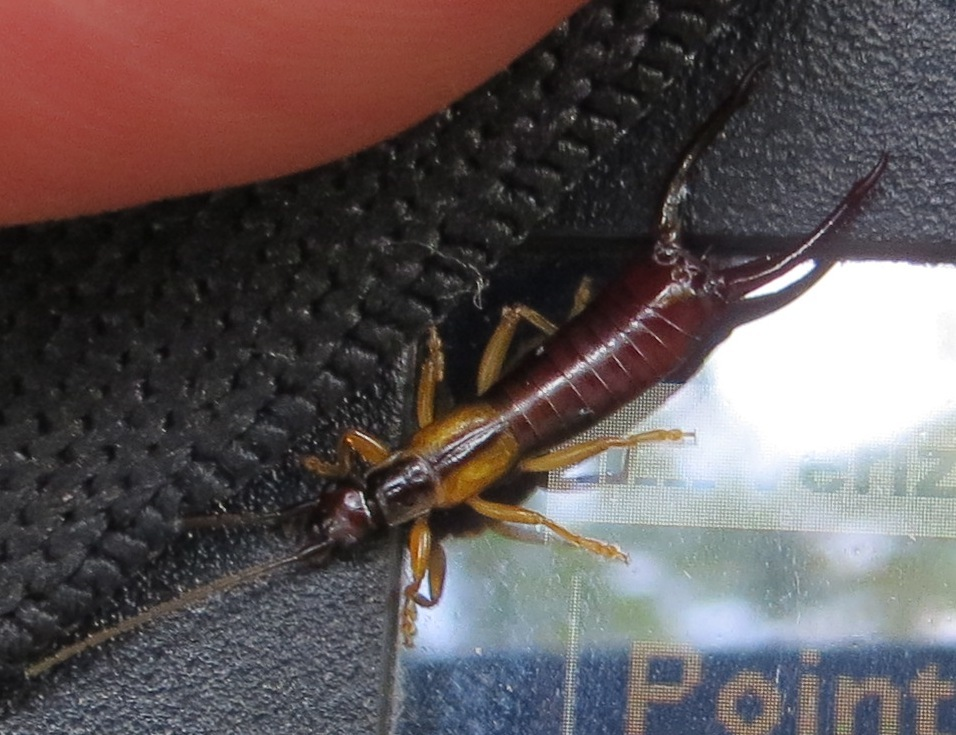
Doru aculeatum

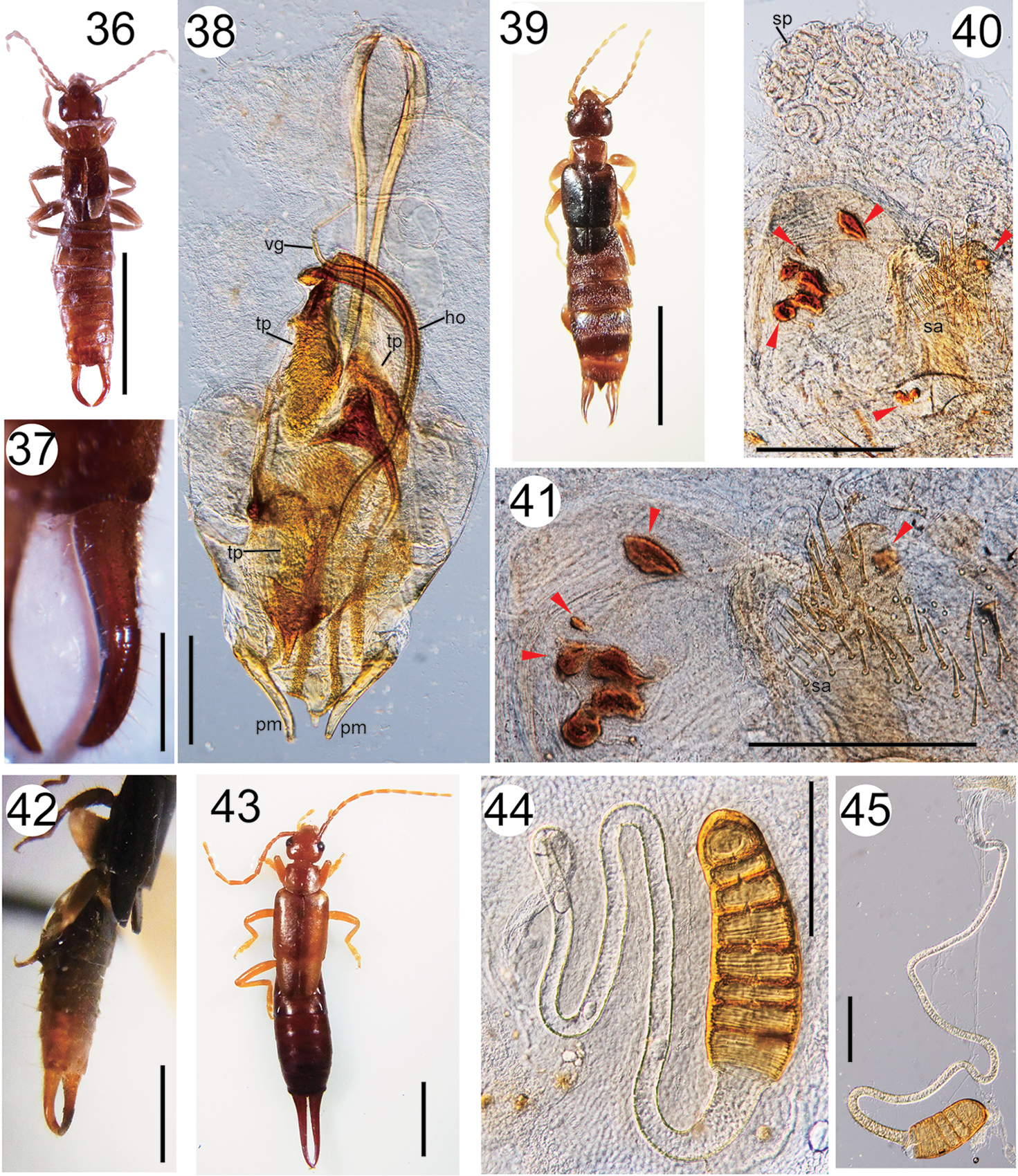
Various earwigs; 43 is Doru luteipes, 44 is spermatheca of D. luteipes, 45 is spermatheca of D. lineare

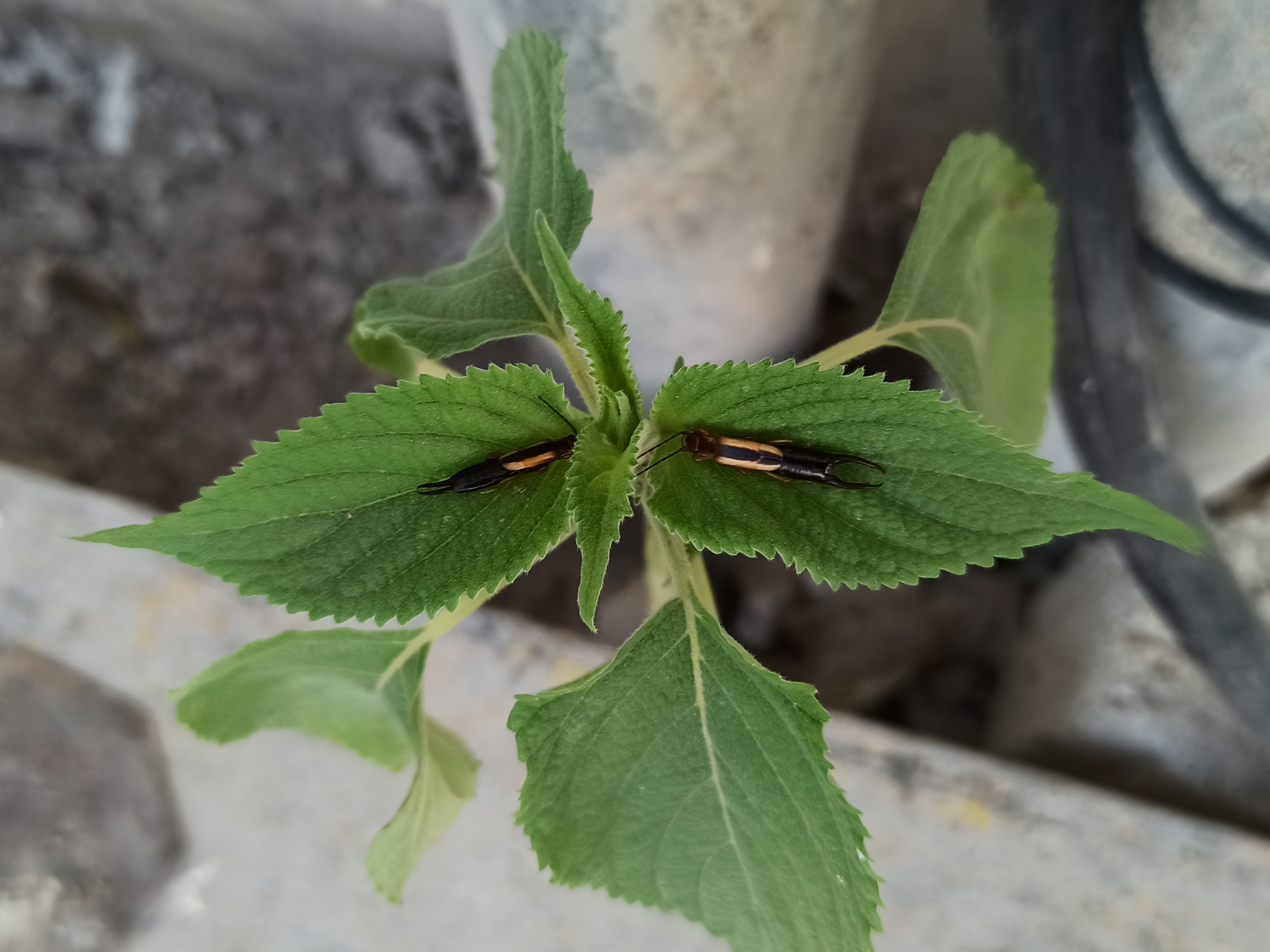
D. taeniatum on foliage

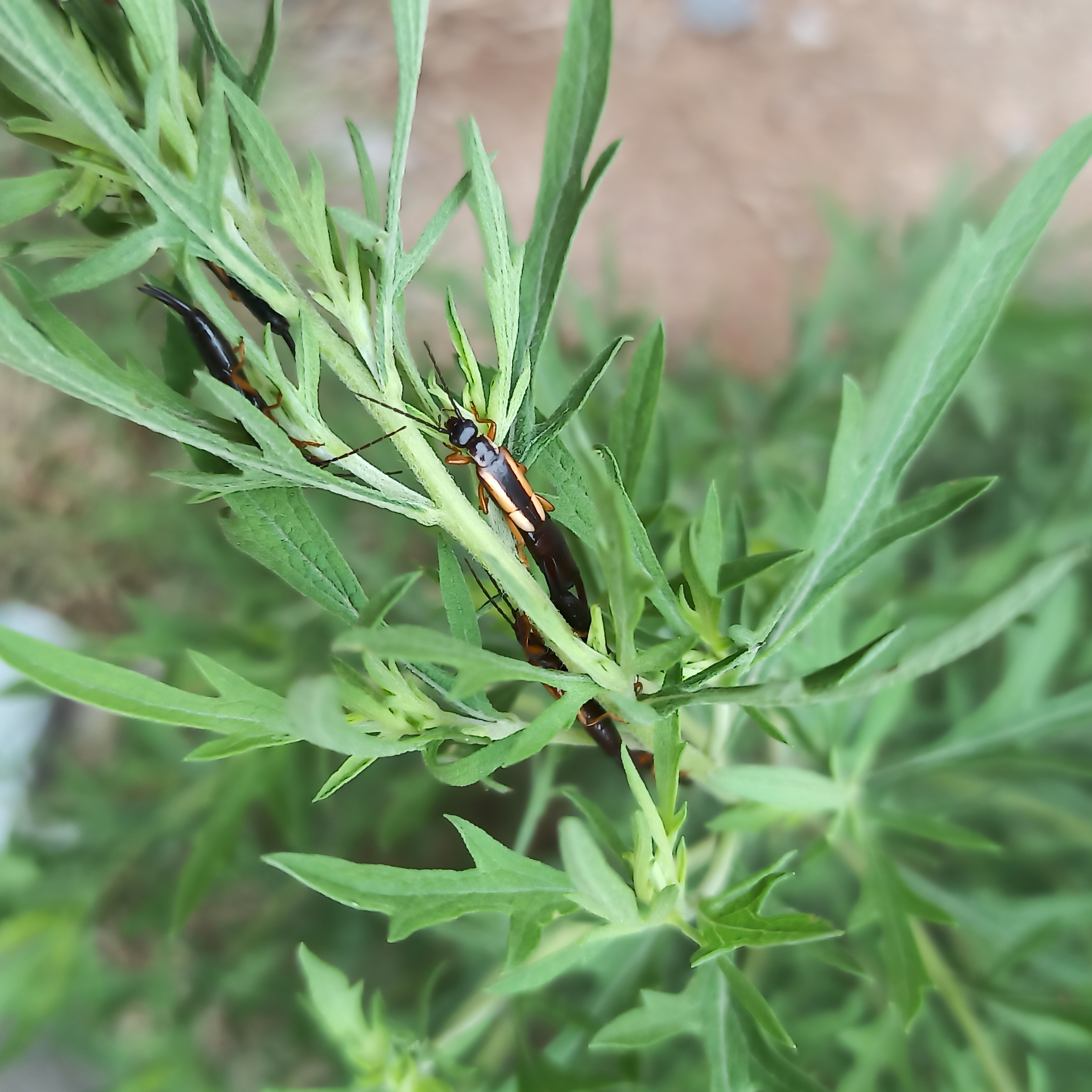
D. taeniatum on foliage
