= Trichactia =

Scientific classification
- Kingdom: Animalia
- Phylum: Arthropoda
- Clade: Pancrustacea
- Class: Insecta
- Order: Diptera
- Family: Tachinidae
- Subfamily: Tachininae
- Tribe: Bigonichetini
- Genus: Trichactia; Stein, 1924

Type species
- Thryptocera securicornis Egger, 1865

Synonyms
- Trichaeta Becker, 1908

Genus of flies

Trichactia is a genus of flies in the family Tachinidae.

== Species ==
- Trichactia meridiana Ziegler & Gilasian, 2018
- Trichactia nubilinervis (Becker, 1908)
- Trichactia pictiventris (Zetterstedt, 1855)
