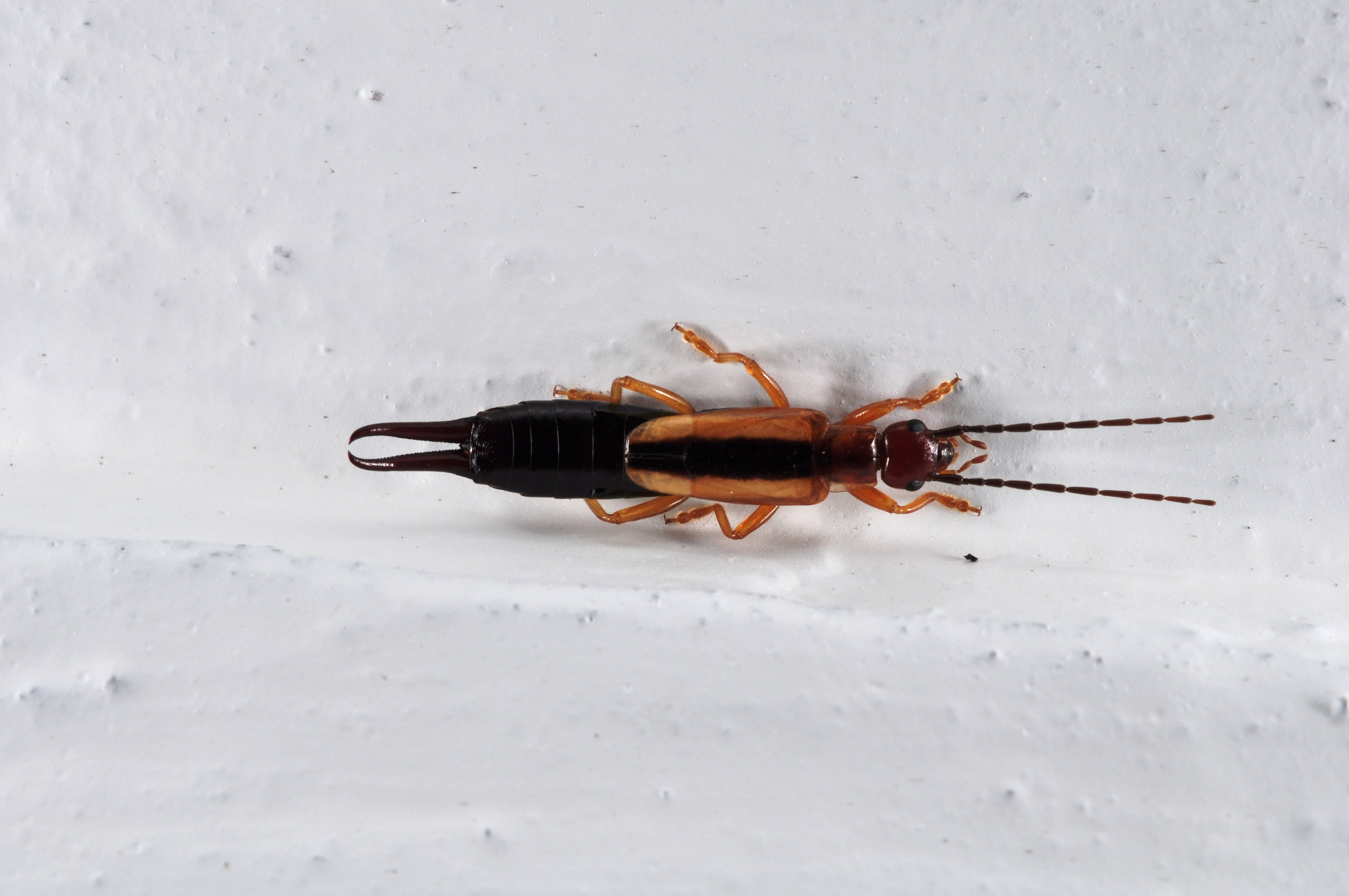

Scientific classification
- Domain: Eukaryota
- Kingdom: Animalia
- Phylum: Arthropoda
- Class: Insecta
- Order: Dermaptera
- Family: Forficulidae
- Genus: Doru
- Species: D. taeniatum

Binomial name
- Doru taeniatum (Dohrn, 1862)

= Doru taeniatum =

Species of earwig

Doru taeniatum, the lined earwig, is a species of earwig in the family Forficulidae. It is found in Central America, North America, and South America.
