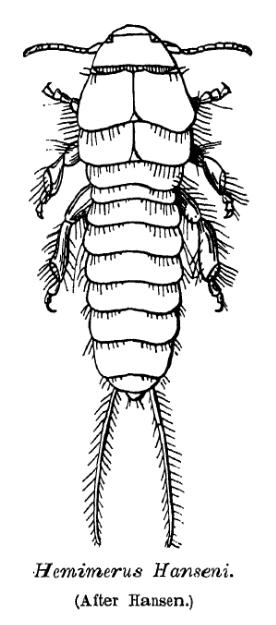
- Hemimerus hanseni

Scientific classification
- Domain: Eukaryota
- Kingdom: Animalia
- Phylum: Arthropoda
- Class: Insecta
- Order: Dermaptera
- Family: Hemimeridae
- Genus: Hemimerus; Walker, 1871

= Hemimerus =

Genus of earwigs

Hemimerus is a genus of earwigs, in the family Hemimeridae. It is one of two genera in the family of Hemimeridae, and contains ten species.

== Species ==
The species in this genus are:

- Hemimerus advectus Rehn & Rehn, 1936
- Hemimerus bouvieri Chopard, 1934
- Hemimerus chevalieri Chopard, 1934
- Hemimerus deceptus Rehn & Rehn, 1936
- Hemimerus hanseni Sharp, 1895
- Hemimerus prolixus Maa, 1974
- Hemimerus sessor Rehn & Rehn, 1936
- Hemimerus talpoides Walker, 1871
- Hemimerus vicinus Rehn & Rehn, 1936
- Hemimerus vosseleri Rehn & Rehn, 1936
