= Lesser naked bat =

Conservation status
- Least Concern (IUCN 3.1)

Scientific classification
- Kingdom: Animalia
- Phylum: Chordata
- Class: Mammalia
- Order: Chiroptera
- Family: Molossidae
- Genus: Cheiromeles
- Species: C. parvidens

Binomial name
- Cheiromeles parvidens Miller & Hollister, 1921
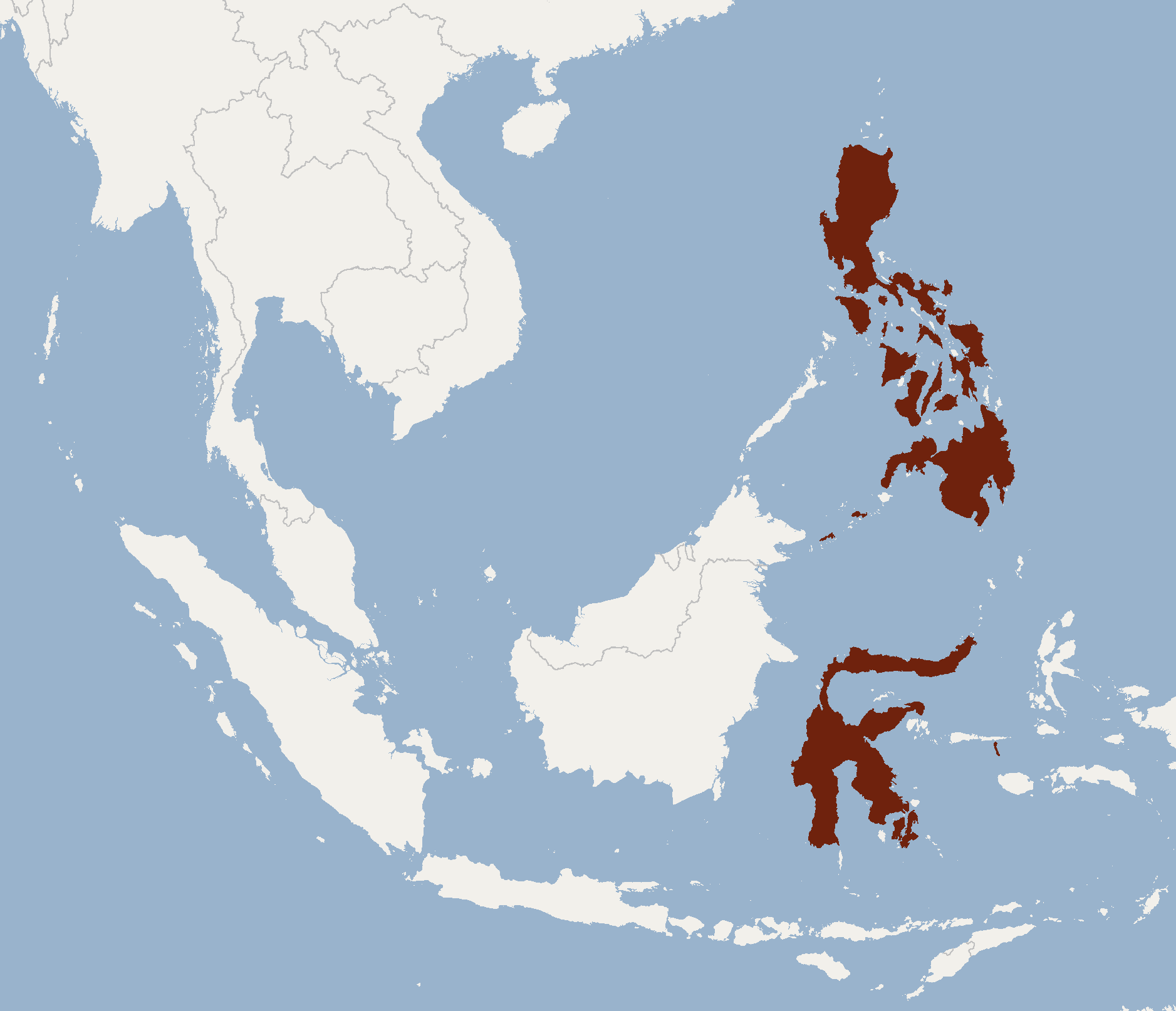

Species of bat

The lesser naked bat (Cheiromeles parvidens) is a species of bat in the family Molossidae, the free-tailed bats. It is native to Indonesia and the Philippines.

This is a little-known species and its population status is unclear. It is known to roost in hollow trees and it feeds on insects.
