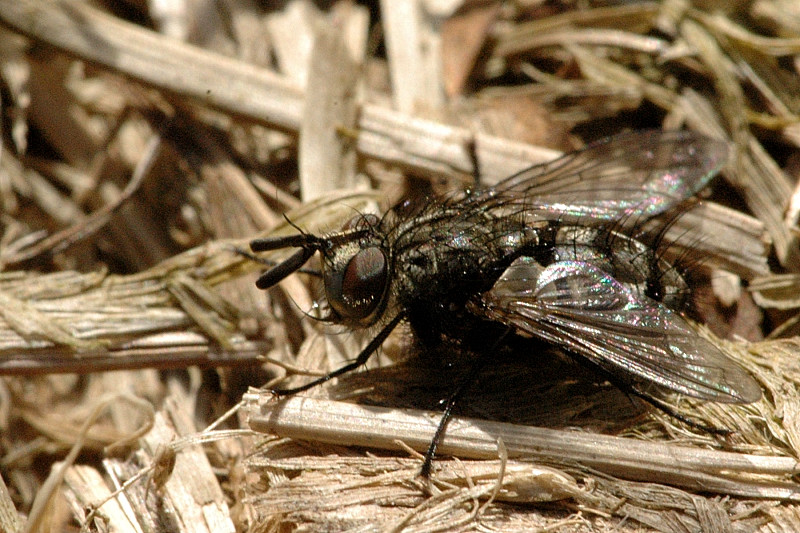
- Triarthria setipennis

Scientific classification
- Kingdom: Animalia
- Phylum: Arthropoda
- Class: Insecta
- Order: Diptera
- Family: Tachinidae
- Subfamily: Tachininae
- Tribe: Bigonichetini
- Genus: Triarthria; Stephens, 1829

Type species
- Tachina spinipennis Meigen, 1824

Synonyms
- Bigonichaeta Schiner, 1864; Bigonicheta Rondani, 1845; Digonochaeta Scudder, 1882; Dira Gistel, 1848; Osmaea Robineau-Desvoidy, 1830; Parkerella Townsend, 1942; Ramburia Robineau-Desvoidy, 1851; Stephania Robineau-Desvoidy, 1863; Triarthra Gistel, 1848; Trichonevra Lioy, 1864

= Triarthria =

Genus of flies

Triarthria is a genus of flies in the family Tachinidae.

== Species ==
- Triarthria legeri (Villeneuve, 1908)
- Triarthria parva (Townsend, 1942)
- Triarthria setipennis (Fallén, 1810)
- Triarthria tienshanensis Ziegler, 1991
