= Lissoglossa =

Scientific classification
- Kingdom: Animalia
- Phylum: Arthropoda
- Clade: Pancrustacea
- Class: Insecta
- Order: Diptera
- Family: Tachinidae
- Subfamily: Tachininae
- Tribe: Bigonichetini
- Genus: Lissoglossa; Villeneuve, 1912

Type species
- Lissoglossa bequaerti Villeneuve, 1912

Synonyms
- Villeneuvia Townsend, 1921; Villeneuvimyia Townsend, 1926

Genus of flies

Lissoglossa is a genus of flies in the family Tachinidae.

== Species ==
- Lissoglossa bequaerti Villeneuve, 1912
- Lissoglossa taeniata Villeneuve, 1912
