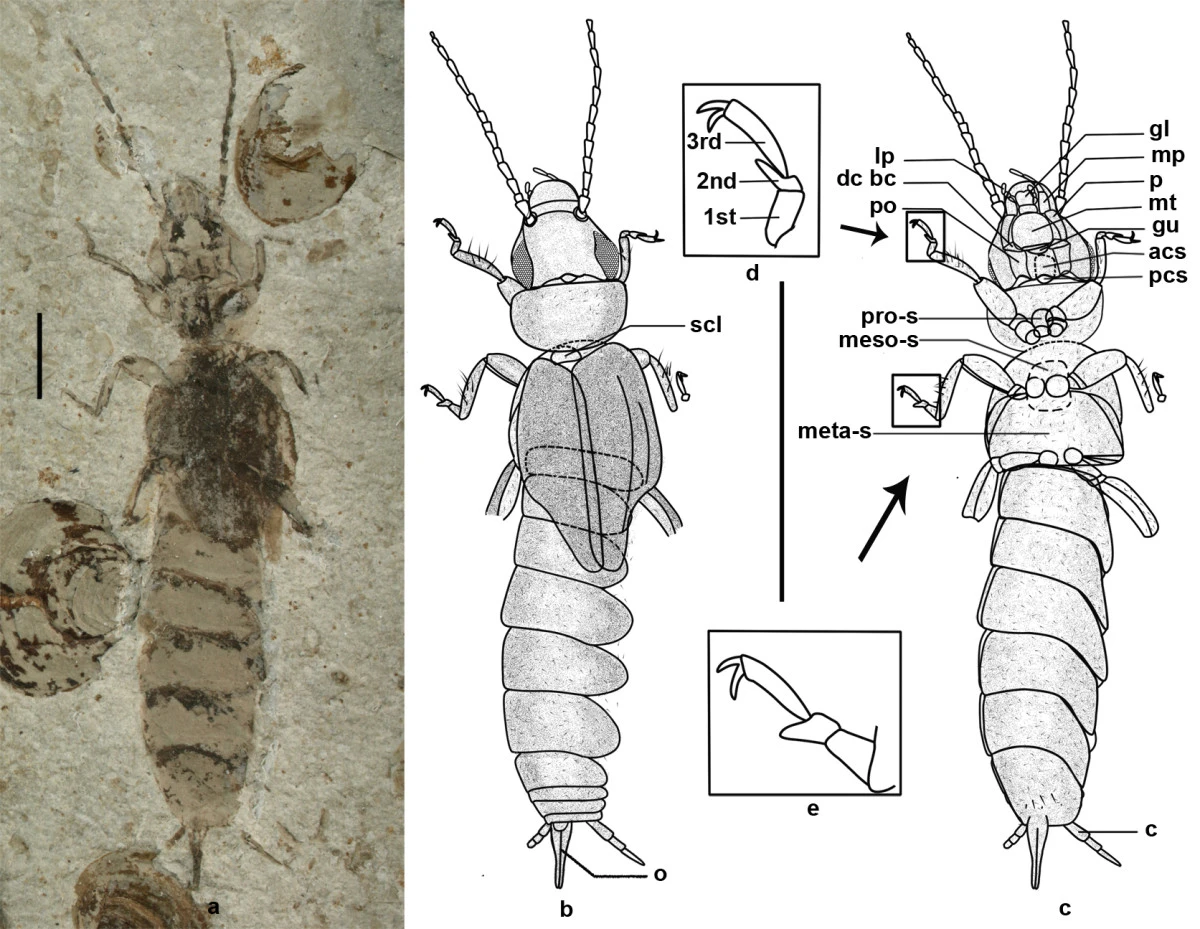
- Belloderma arcuata

Scientific classification
- Domain: Eukaryota
- Kingdom: Animalia
- Phylum: Arthropoda
- Class: Insecta
- Order: Dermaptera
- Suborder: †Eodermaptera; Engel, 2003

Families
- See text

= Eodermaptera =

Eodermaptera Temporal range: Callovian–Aptian

Extinct suborder of earwigs

Eodermaptera is an extinct suborder of earwigs known from the Middle Jurassic to Mid Cretaceous. Defining characteristics include "tarsi three-segmented, tegmina retain venation, 8th and 9th abdominal tergite in females are narrowed, but separate from 10th tergite and not covered by 7th tergite and exposed ovipositor" They are considered to be more closely related to Neodermaptera than the more basal Archidermaptera.

== Systematics ==
- Family Bellodermatidae Zhao, Shih & Ren, 2010
  - †Belloderma Zhao, Shih & Ren, 2010 Daohugou, China, Middle Jurassic (Callovian)
- †Archaeosoma Zhang 1994 Laiyang Formation, China, Early Cretaceous (Aptian)
- Superfamily Semenovioloidea Vishnyakova 1980
  - Family Turanodermatidae Engel 2003
    - †Turanoderma Vishnyakova 1980 Karabastau Formation, Kazakhstan, Middle-Late Jurassic (Callovian/Oxfordian)
  - Family Semenoviolidae Vishnyakova 1980
    - †Semenovioloides Vishnyakova 1980 Karabastau Formation, Kazakhstan, Callovian/Oxfordian
    - †Aglyptoderma Xiong et al, 2021 Jiulongshan Formation, China, Callovian
