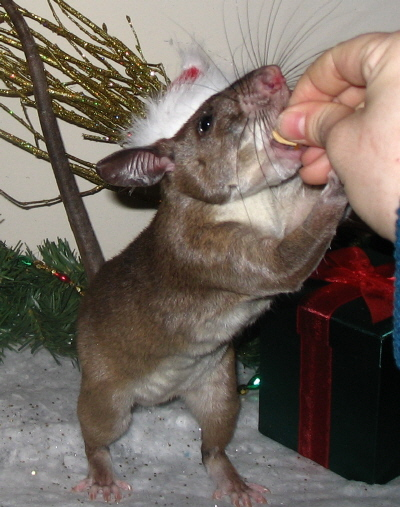

Conservation status
- Least Concern (IUCN 3.1)

Scientific classification
- Kingdom: Animalia
- Phylum: Chordata
- Class: Mammalia
- Order: Rodentia
- Family: Nesomyidae
- Genus: Cricetomys
- Species: C. emini

Binomial name
- Cricetomys emini Wroughton, 1910

= Emin's pouched rat =

Species of rodent

Emin's pouched rat (Cricetomys emini), also known as the African pouched rat, is a large rat of the muroid superfamily. It is related to Cricetomys gambianus, the Gambian pouched rat. Both species belong to Cricetomys, the genus of the giant pouched rats.

These animals were introduced into the exotic pet trade, but on June 11, 2003, the Centers for Disease Control (CDC) and US Food and Drug Administration (FDA) prohibited the importation of all African rodents into the United States in response to an outbreak of monkeypox, and FDA banned the sale, distribution, transport, or release into the environment of six African rodent species. This order was subsequently superseded by an interim final rule on November 3, 2003 (42 CFR § 71.56 and 42 CFR § 1240.63). They are easily tamed.

== Comparison to Gambian pouched rats ==
They are native to Africa and are found along the edges of forests and along the plains. Emin's pouched rats are actually better climbers than their better known Gambian pouched rat cousins. These pouched rats are named for having cheek pouches much like a hamster.

Emin's pouched rat and the Gambian pouched rat have a few very noticeable physical differences:

- Emin's pouched rats have a distinct line of color difference between their lower abdomen area and upper body. The abdomen is grey/white, whereas their upper body is dark brown. The tail has a white tip to it. Gambian pouched rats have a greyish-brown color that is fairly uniform throughout their body, only gradually getting lighter on their abdomen.
- Emin's pouched rats are very sleek and muscular in appearance. They are quite slender-looking and are excellent climbers. Gambians are somewhat bulky, rough-looking, and have been reported to be less "arboreal" than the Emin's.
- Emin's pouched rats tend to weigh less and be slightly smaller than Gambian pouched rats.

== As pets ==
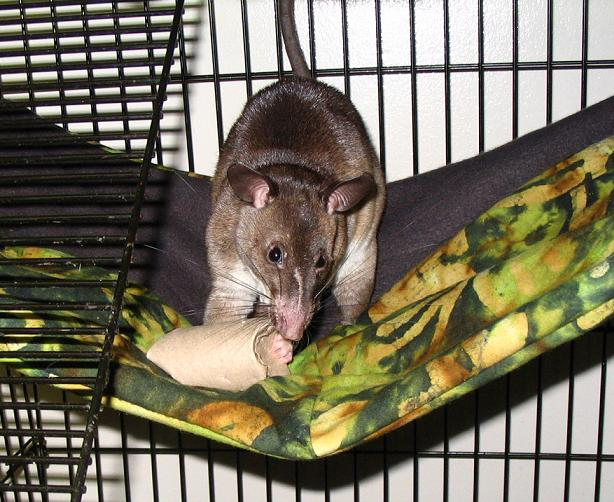
Emin's pouched rat

Both the Gambian pouched rat and Emin's pouched rat were introduced into the exotic pet trade. Unfortunately, many dealers and breeders failed to recognize the difference in the two species and some even tried breeding the two together. There have been reports of it being successful, and other reports of offspring dying at birth. Both species are sometimes kept as pets, but males can be territorial to others of the same species.
