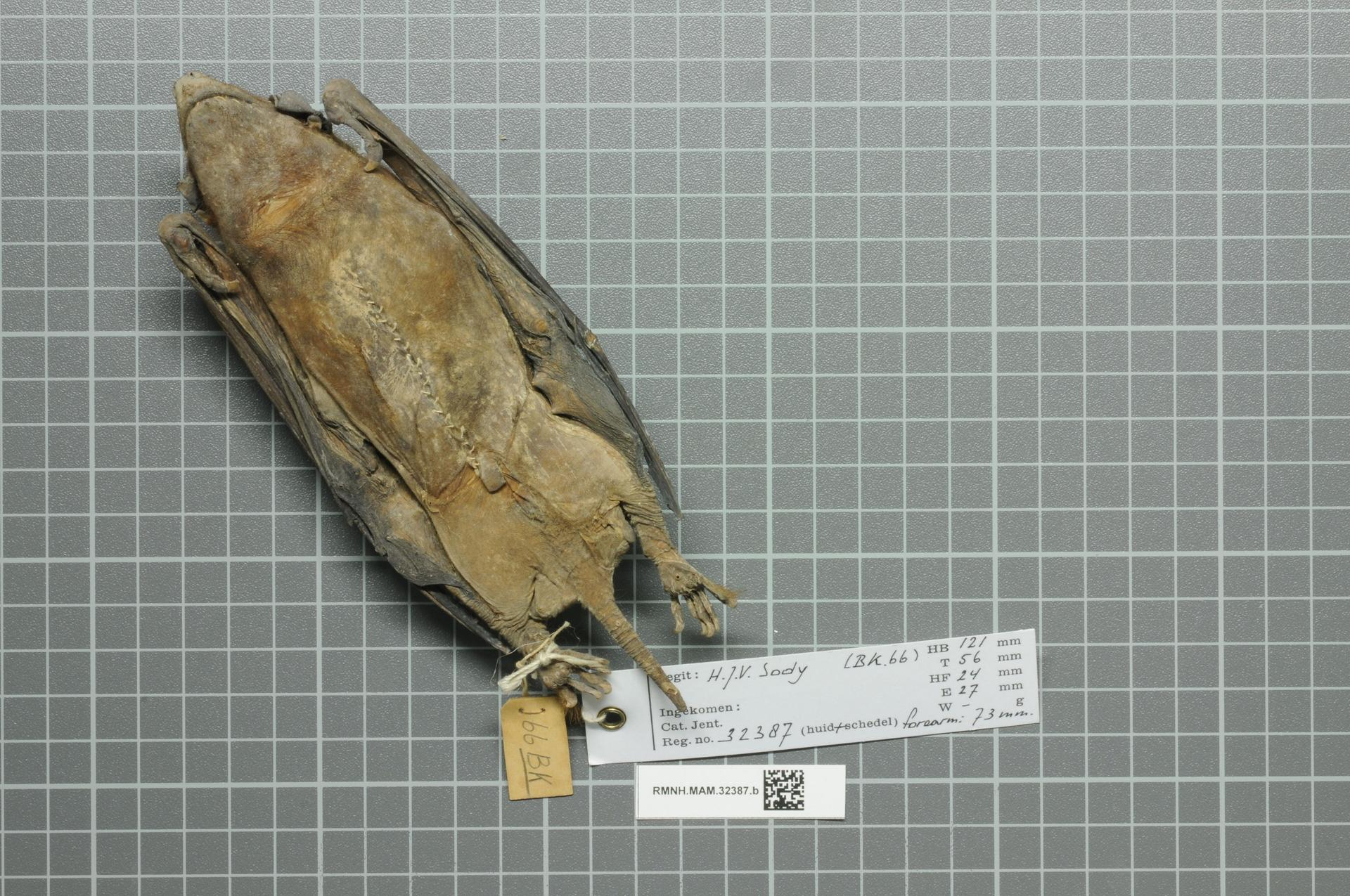
- Cheiromeles torquatus museum specimen

Scientific classification
- Domain: Eukaryota
- Kingdom: Animalia
- Phylum: Chordata
- Class: Mammalia
- Order: Chiroptera
- Family: Molossidae
- Genus: Cheiromeles; Horsfield, 1824

Type species
- Cheiromeles torquata Horsfield, 1824

Species
- 2, see text

= Cheiromeles =

Genus of bats

Cheiromeles is a genus of bats in the family Molossidae, the free-tailed bats. The genus was erected and described by Thomas Horsfield, who developed the name from the Greek word cheir ("hand"), a reference to the hand-like hindfoot, which has a toe that flexes like an opposable thumb. These bats have mostly hairless bodies and fold their wings into pouches of skin along their bodies when at rest. These are among the largest insectivorous bats, weighing up to 135 grams.

There are two species in this genus:

- Lesser naked bat Cheiromeles parvidens
- Hairless bat Cheiromeles torquatus
