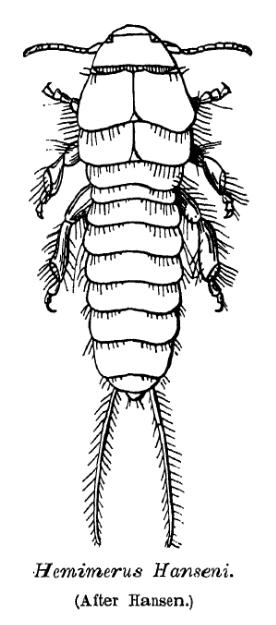
- Hemimerus hanseni from the Manual of Entomology.

Scientific classification
- Domain: Eukaryota
- Kingdom: Animalia
- Phylum: Arthropoda
- Class: Insecta
- Order: Dermaptera
- Suborder: Neodermaptera
- Infraorder: Epidermaptera
- Superfamily: Hemimeroidea; Sharp, 1895
- Family: Hemimeridae; Sharp, 1895

= Hemimeridae =

Family of earwig insects

Hemimeridae is a family of earwigs in the suborder Neodermaptera. Hemimeridae was formerly considered a suborder, Hemimerina, but was reduced in rank to family and included in the new suborder Neodermaptera.

Hemimeridae is represented by two genera, Hemimerus and Araeomerus. They are wingless, blind and viviparous ectoparasites of African rodents, and have filiform segmented cerci. The best known species is Hemimerus bouvieri. Hemimeridae contains eleven described species placed within two genera: Hemimerus and Araeomerus (Nakata and Maa, 1974). Hemimerids are relatively small (5–15 mm) and inhabit the fur of giant nesomyid rats in Africa. Hemimerids have short, broad legs with grooves that allow them to cling to the host and specialized mouthparts for scraping dead skin and fungus from their host (Nakata and Maa, 1974). Araeomerus is found in the nest of long-tailed pouch rats (Beamys) and Hemimerus is found on giant (Cricetomys) rats (Nakata and Maa, 1974). Araeomerus are found more often in the burrows and nests of Beamys rat than on the rat itself, while Hemimerus less frequently leaves its host.

== Genera ==
The family contains the following genera:

- Araeomerus Maa, 1974
- Hemimerus Walker, 1871
