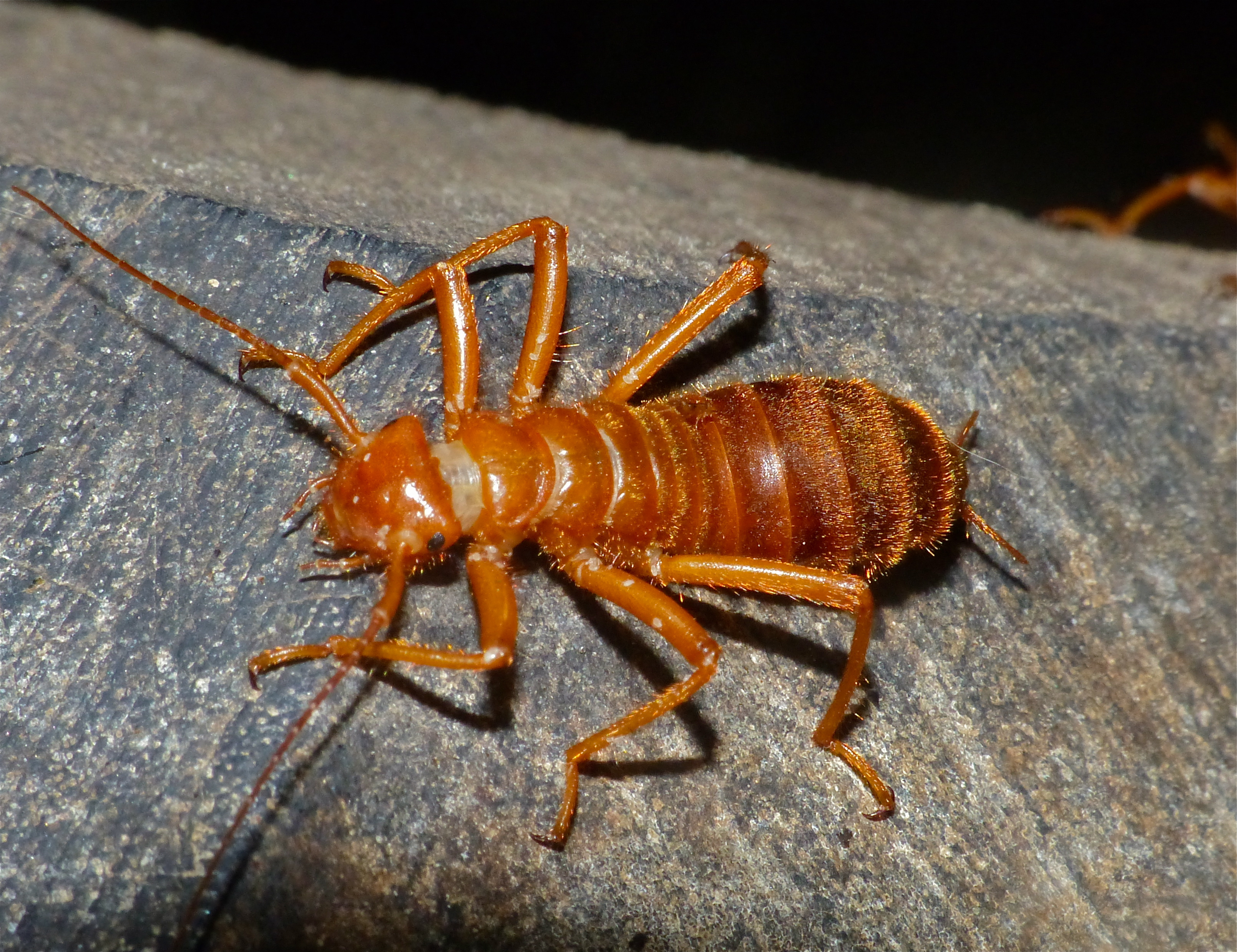
- Arixenia esau

Scientific classification
- Kingdom: Animalia
- Phylum: Arthropoda
- Class: Insecta
- Order: Dermaptera
- Suborder: Neodermaptera
- Infraorder: Epidermaptera
- Superfamily: Forficuloidea
- Family: Arixeniidae; Jordan, 1909

= Arixeniidae =

Family of earwigs

Arixeniidae is a family of earwigs in the suborder Neodermaptera. Arixeniidae was formerly considered a suborder, Arixeniina, but was reduced in rank to family and included in the new suborder Neodermaptera.

Arixeniidae is represented by two genera, Arixenia and Xeniaria, with a total of five species. Arixenia esau and Xeniaria jacobsoni are the most well-known. As with Hemimerina, they are blind, wingless ectoparasites with filiform segmented cerci. They are ectoparasites of various Southeast Asian bats, particularly of the genus Cheiromeles (i.e., "naked bulldog bats").

== Genera ==
The family includes the following genera:

- Arixenia Jordan, 1909
- Xeniaria Maa, 1974
