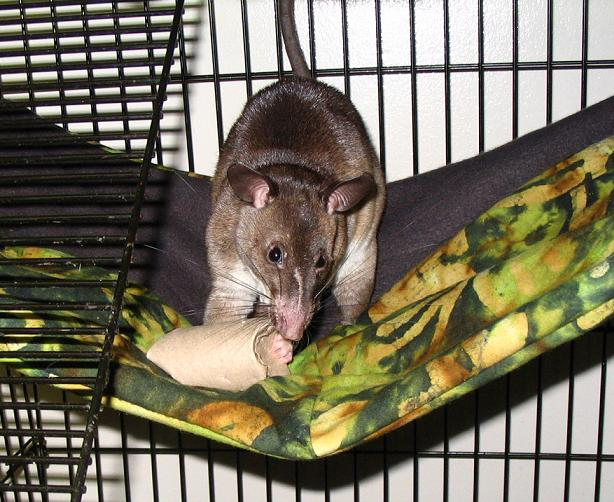
- Emin's pouched rat (Cricetomys emini)

Scientific classification
- Kingdom: Animalia
- Phylum: Chordata
- Class: Mammalia
- Order: Rodentia
- Family: Nesomyidae
- Subfamily: Cricetomyinae
- Genus: Cricetomys; Waterhouse, 1840

Species
- Cricetomys ansorgei; Cricetomys emini; Cricetomys gambianus; Cricetomys kivuensis

= Giant pouched rat =

Genus of rodents

The giant pouched rats (genus Cricetomys) of sub-Saharan Africa are large muroid rodents.

== Description ==
Their head and body lengths range from 25–45 cm (10–17.5 in) with scaly tails ranging from 36–46 cm (14–18 in). They weigh between 1.0 and 1.5 kg (2.2 and 3.3 lb).

== Taxonomy ==
Giant pouched rats are only distantly related to the true rats, although until recently they had been placed in the same family, Muridae. Recent molecular studies, however, place them in the family Nesomyidae, part of an ancient radiation of African and Malagasy muroids. The name "pouched rat" refers to their large cheek pouches.

The species are:

Image	Common name	Scientific name	Distribution
	Southern giant pouched rat	Cricetomys ansorgei	Zimbabwe, Kenya, Tanzania, Zambia, and the Democratic Republic of Congo.
	Emin's pouched rat	Cricetomys emini	Tropical Africa, Madagascar
	Gambian pouched rat	Cricetomys gambianus	Senegal to Kenya and from Angola to Mozambique
	Kivu giant pouched rat	Cricetomys kivuensis	Southern Africa

== Behaviour ==
Females have been said to be capable of producing up to 10 litters yearly. Gestation is 27–36 days. The animals generally have between six and eight nipples. One to five young are born at a time.

The animals are nocturnal omnivores, and feed on vegetation and small animals, especially insects. They have a particular taste for palm nuts.

== Interaction with humans ==
In many African countries, giant pouched rats are valued as an important food item.

They are easily tamed as pets, but were associated with an outbreak of mpox in the USA in 2003, and have since been banned from importation to the U.S.

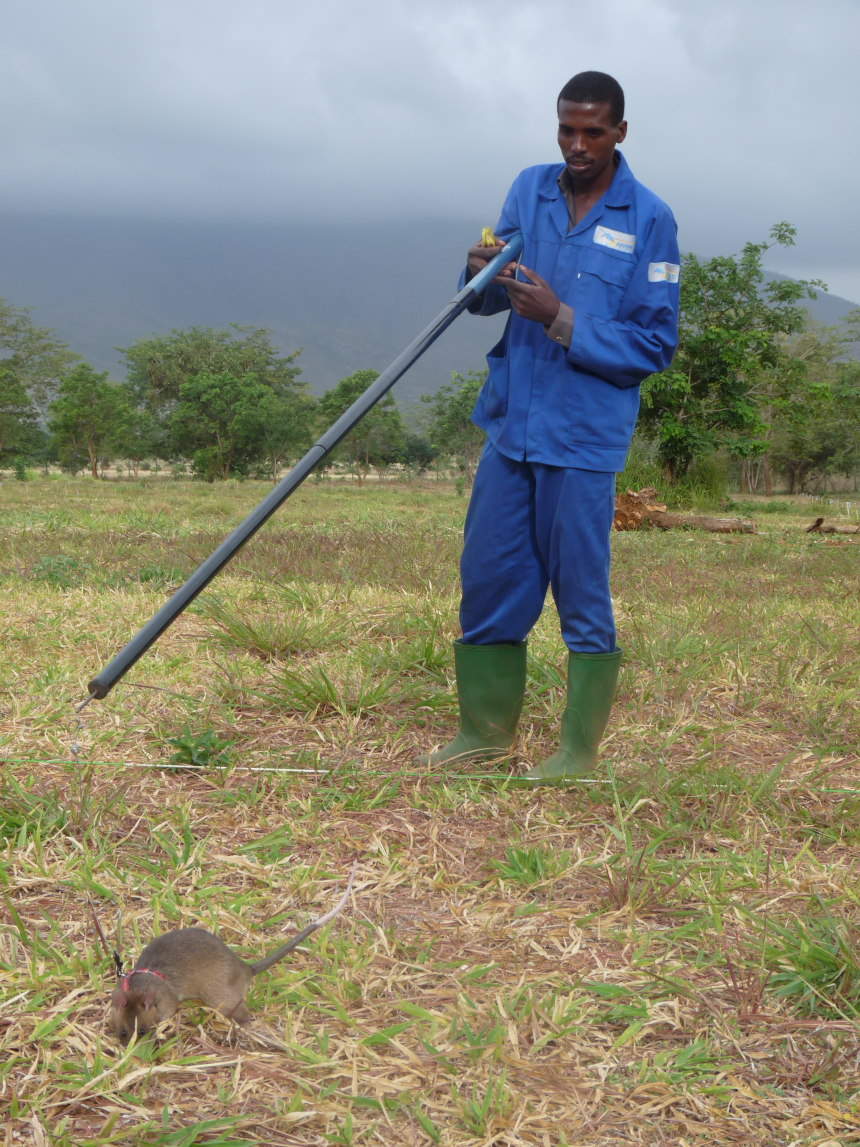
A HeroRAT finds a land mine in a training field in Morogoro, Tanzania

=== Detecting explosives and tuberculosis by scent ===
These rats are also becoming useful in some areas for detecting land mines; their acute sense of smell is very effective in detecting explosives such as TNT, and at the same time they are light enough to not trigger any of the mines including antipersonnel mines. The rats are being trained by APOPO, a nonprofit social venture based in Tanzania.

The procedure for training rats to detect land mines was conceived of and developed by Belgian Bart Weetjens. Training starts at four weeks of age, when the rats are handled to accustom them to humans and exposed to a variety of sights and sounds. They learn to associate a clicker with a food reward of banana or banana-peanut paste. They are then trained to indicate a hole that contains TNT by nosing it for five seconds. Then they learn to find the correct hole in a line of holes. Finally, the rat is trained to wear a harness and practises outdoors on a lead, finding inactive mines under soil. At the end of their training, they are tested; they must find all the mines in an area of 400 m^{2} (480 yd^{2}) that has been seeded with inactivated mines. It is a blind test; their handlers do not know where the mines are. If they succeed, they are certified as bomb-sniffing rats.

APOPO is also training the rats to detect tuberculosis by sniffing sputum samples to detect Mycobacterium tuberculosis. The rats can test many more samples than laboratory techniques can—100 in 20 minutes, which would take a lab technician up to four days using conventional microscopy. Furthermore, samples submitted for secondary screening by the rats reassess 52% of initially negative tests are as positive. In some cases TB detected by rats has not been confirmed by clinical tests, but patients later developed TB, suggesting that rats can detect the disease before a clinical test. As of 2024 they were being used to screen for tuberculosis in Tanzania and Ethiopia.

Land mine and tuberculosis sniffing rats are called HeroRATs.

== In popular culture ==
Ben, in the 2003 remake of Willard, was a Gambian pouched rat.
