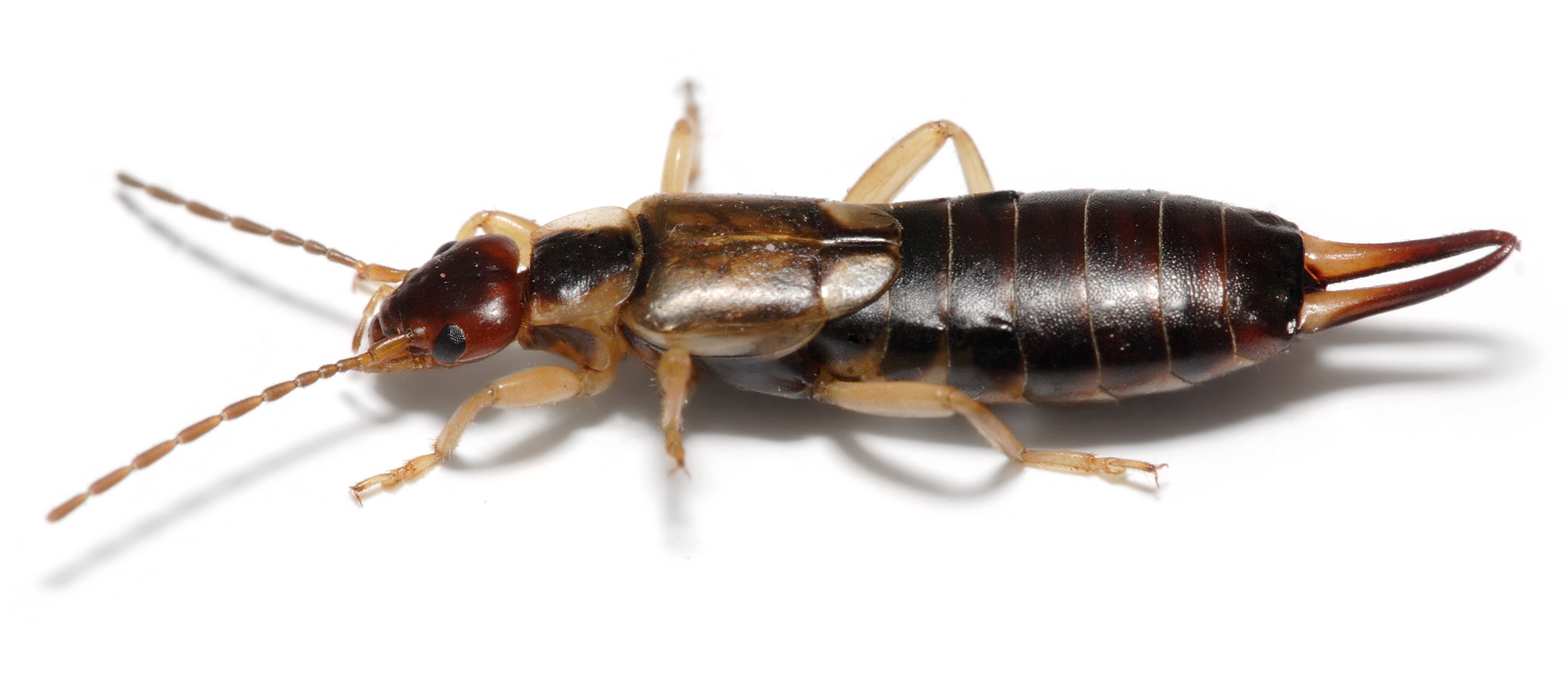
- Female common earwig, Forficula auricularia

Scientific classification
- Kingdom: Animalia
- Phylum: Arthropoda
- Clade: Pancrustacea
- Class: Insecta
- Cohort: Polyneoptera
- Superorder: Dermapterida
- Order: Dermaptera; De Geer, 1773

Suborders
- †Archidermaptera; Pandermaptera; †Eodermaptera; Neodermaptera; Anisolabididae; Apachyidae; Arixeniidae; Chelisochidae; Forficulidae; Spongiphoridae; Hemimeridae; Karschiellidae; Diplatyidae; Haplodiplatyidae; Pygidicranidae

Synonyms
- Euplecoptera; Euplexoptera; Forficulida

= Earwig =

Earwig Temporal range: 208–0 Ma Late Triassic to Recent

Order of insects

Earwigs make up the insect order Dermaptera. With about 2,000 species in 12 families, they are one of the smaller insect orders. Earwigs have characteristic cerci, a pair of forceps-like pincers on their abdomen, and membranous wings folded underneath short, rarely used forewings, hence the scientific order name, "skin wings". Some groups are tiny parasites on mammals and lack the typical pincers. Earwigs are found on all continents except Antarctica.

Earwigs are mostly nocturnal and often hide in small, moist crevices during the day, and are active at night, feeding on a wide variety of insects and plants. Damage to foliage, flowers, and various crops is commonly blamed on earwigs, especially the common earwig Forficula auricularia.

Earwigs have five molts in the year before they become adults. Many earwig species display maternal care, which is uncommon among insects. Female earwigs may care for their eggs; the ones that do will continue to watch over nymphs until their second molt. As the nymphs molt, sexual dimorphism such as differences in pincer shapes begins to show.

Extant Dermaptera belong to the suborder Neodermaptera, which first appeared during the Cretaceous. Some earwig specimen fossils are placed with extinct suborders Archidermaptera or Eodermaptera, the former dating to the Late Triassic and the latter to the Middle Jurassic. Dermaptera belongs to the major grouping Polyneoptera, and are amongst the earliest diverging members of the group, alongside angel insects (Zoraptera), and stoneflies (Plecoptera), but the exact relationship among the three groups is uncertain.

== Etymology ==
Earwig diagram with wings extended and closed

An earwig crawling on wood

The scientific name for the order, Dermaptera, is Greek in origin, stemming from the words derma, meaning 'skin', and pteron (plural ptera), meaning 'wing'. It was coined by Charles De Geer in 1773. The common term, earwig, is derived from the Old English ēare, which means 'ear', and wicga, which means 'insect', or literally, 'beetle'. Entomologists suggest that the origin of the name is a reference to the appearance of the hindwings, which are unique and distinctive among insects, and resemble a human ear when unfolded. The name is more popularly thought to be related to the old wives' tale that earwigs burrowed into the brains of humans through the ear and laid their eggs there. Earwigs are not known to purposefully climb into ear canals, but there have been at least two anecdotal reports of earwigs being found in the ear.

== Distribution ==
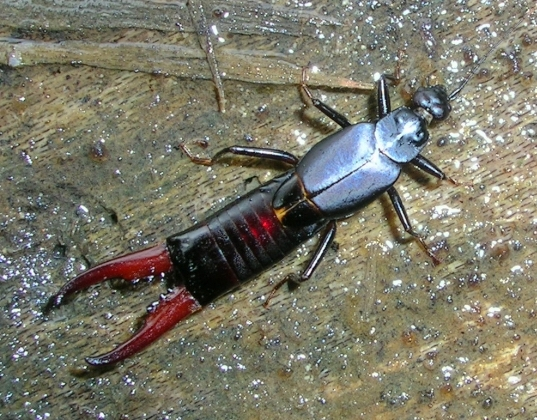
An earwig from the Western Ghats

Earwigs are abundant and can be found throughout the Americas and Eurasia. The common earwig was introduced into North America in 1907 from Europe, but tends to be more common in the southern and southwestern parts of the United States. The only native species of earwig found in the north of the United States is the spine-tailed earwig (Doru aculeatum), found as far north as Canada, where it hides in the leaf axils of emerging plants in southern Ontario wetlands. However, other families can be found in North America, including Forficulidae (Doru and Forficula being found there), Spongiphoridae, Anisolabididae, and Labiduridae.

Few earwigs survive winter outdoors in cold climates. They can be found in tight crevices in woodland, fields and gardens. Out of about 1,800 species, about 25 occur in North America, 45 in Europe (including 7 in Great Britain), and 60 in Australia.

== Morphology ==
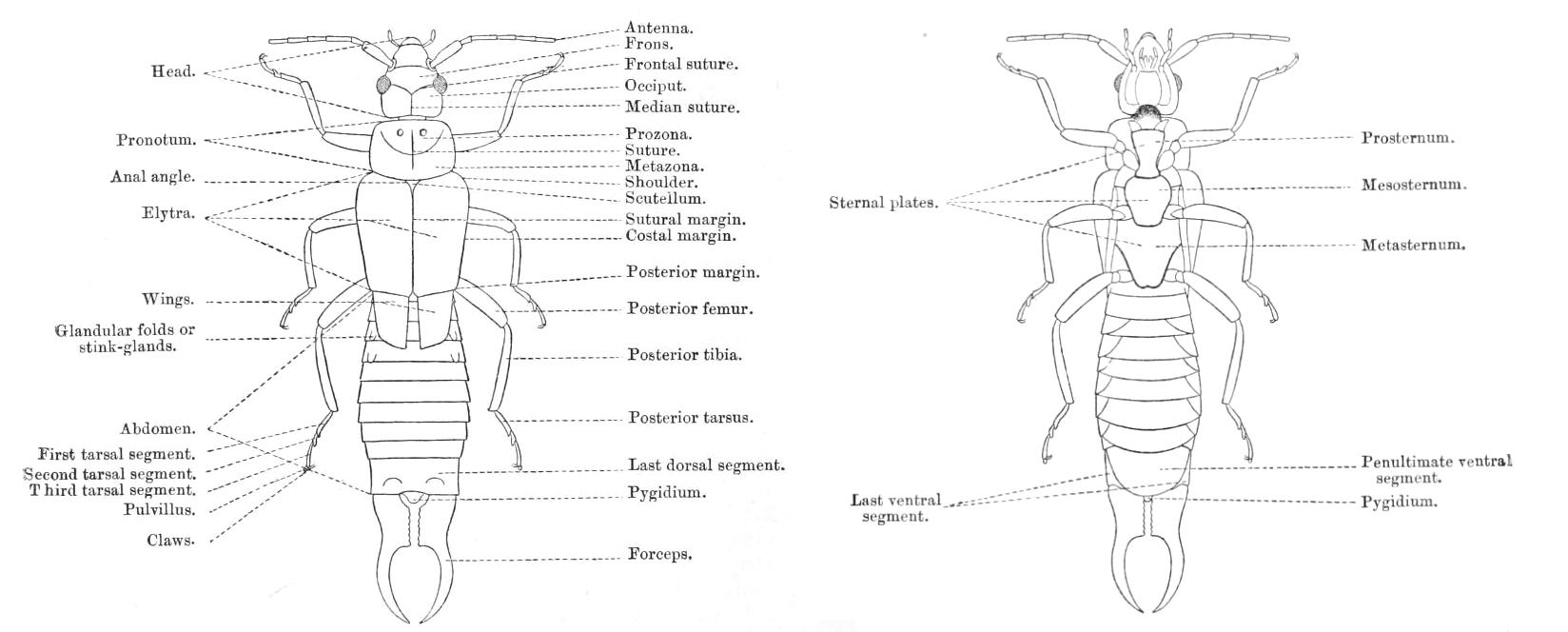
Male earwig, external morphology. Click on image for a larger view

Most earwigs are flattened (which allows them to fit inside tight crevices, such as under bark) with an elongated body generally 7–50 millimetres (1/4–2 in) long. The largest extant species is the Australian giant earwig (Titanolabis colossea) which is approximately 50 mm (2 in) long, while the possibly extinct (declared extinct in 2014) Saint Helena earwig (Labidura herculeana) reached 78 mm (3 1/16 in). Earwigs are characterized by the cerci, or the pair of forceps-like pincers on their abdomen; male earwigs generally have more curved pincers than females. These pincers are used to capture prey, defend themselves and fold their wings under the short tegmina. The antennae are thread-like with at least 10 segments.

Males in the six families Karschiellidae, Pygidicranidae, Diplatyidae, Apachyidae, Anisolabisidae and Labiduridae have paired penises, while the males in the remaining groups have a single penis. Both penises are symmetrical in Pygidicranidae and Diplatyidae, but in Karschiellidae the left one is strongly reduced. Apachyidae, Anisolabisidae, and Labiduridae have an asymmetrical pair, with left and right one pointing on opposite directions when not in use. The females have just a single genital opening, so only one of the paired penises is ever used during copulation.

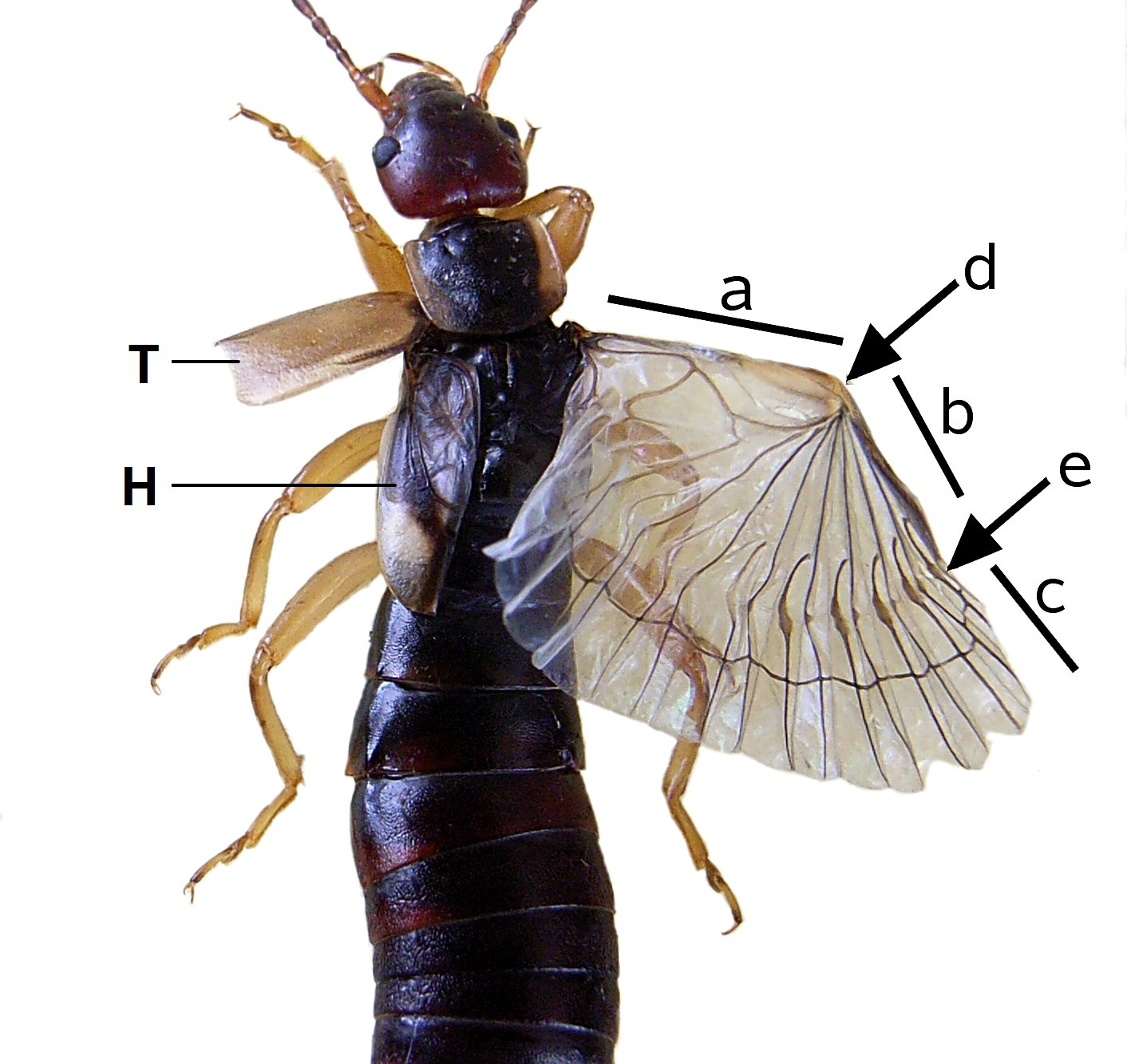
Earwig with right wing open

The forewings are short oblong leathery plates used to cover the hindwings like the elytra of a beetle, rather than to fly. Most species have short and leather-like forewings with very thin hindwings, though species in the former suborders Arixeniina and Hemimerina (epizoic species, sometimes considered as ectoparasites) are wingless and blind with filiform segmented cerci (today these are both included merely as families in the suborder Neodermaptera). The hindwing is a very thin membrane that expands like a fan, radiating from one point folded under the forewing. Even though most earwigs have wings and are capable of flight, they are rarely seen in flight. These wings are unique in venation and in the pattern of folding that requires the use of the cerci.

=== Internal ===
The neuroendocrine system is typical of insects. There is a brain, a subesophageal ganglion, three thoracic ganglia, and six abdominal ganglia. Strong neuron connections connect the neurohemal corpora cardiaca to the brain and frontal ganglion, where the closely related median corpus allatum produces juvenile hormone III in close proximity to the neurohemal dorsal arota. The digestive system of earwigs is like all other insects, consisting of a fore-, mid-, and hindgut, but earwigs lack gastric caecae which are specialized for digestion in many species of insect. Long, slender (excretory) malpighian tubules can be found between the junction of the mid- and hind gut.

The reproductive system of females consist of paired ovaries, lateral oviducts, spermatheca, and a genital chamber. The lateral ducts are where the eggs leave the body, while the spermatheca is where sperm is stored. Unlike other insects, the gonopore, or genital opening is behind the seventh abdominal segment. The ovaries are primitive in that they are polytrophic (the nurse cells and oocytes alternate along the length of the ovariole). In some species these long ovarioles branch off the lateral duct, while in others, short ovarioles appear around the duct.

== Life cycle and reproduction ==
The life cycle and development of a male earwig from egg to each instar

Earwigs are hemimetabolous, meaning they undergo incomplete metamorphosis, developing through a series of four to six molts. The developmental stages between molts are called instars. Earwigs live for about a year from hatching. They start mating in the autumn, and can be found together in the autumn and winter. The male and female will live in a chamber in debris, crevices, or soil 2.5 centimetres (1 in) deep. After mating, the sperm may remain in the female for months before the eggs are fertilized. From midwinter to early spring, the male will leave, or be driven out by the female. Afterward the female will begin to lay 20 to 80 pearly white eggs in two days. Some earwigs, those parasitic in the suborders Arixeniina and Hemimerina, are viviparous (give birth to live young); they would be fed by a sort of placenta. When first laid, the eggs are white or cream-colored and oval-shaped, but right before hatching they become kidney-shaped and brown. Each egg is approximately 1 mm (1/32 in) tall and 0.8 mm (1/32 in) wide.

Earwigs are among the few non-social insect species that show maternal care. The mother pays close attention to the needs of her eggs, such as warmth and protection. She faithfully defends the eggs from predators, not leaving them even to eat unless the clutch goes bad. She also continuously cleans the eggs to protect them from fungi. Studies have found that the urge to clean the eggs persists for only a few days after they are removed, and does not return even if the eggs are replaced; however, when the eggs were continuously replaced after hatching, the mother continued to clean the new eggs for up to three months.

Studies have also shown that the mother does not immediately recognize her own eggs. After laying them, she gathers them together, and studies have found mothers to pick up small egg-shaped wax balls or stones by accident. Eventually, the impostor eggs were rejected for not having the proper scent.

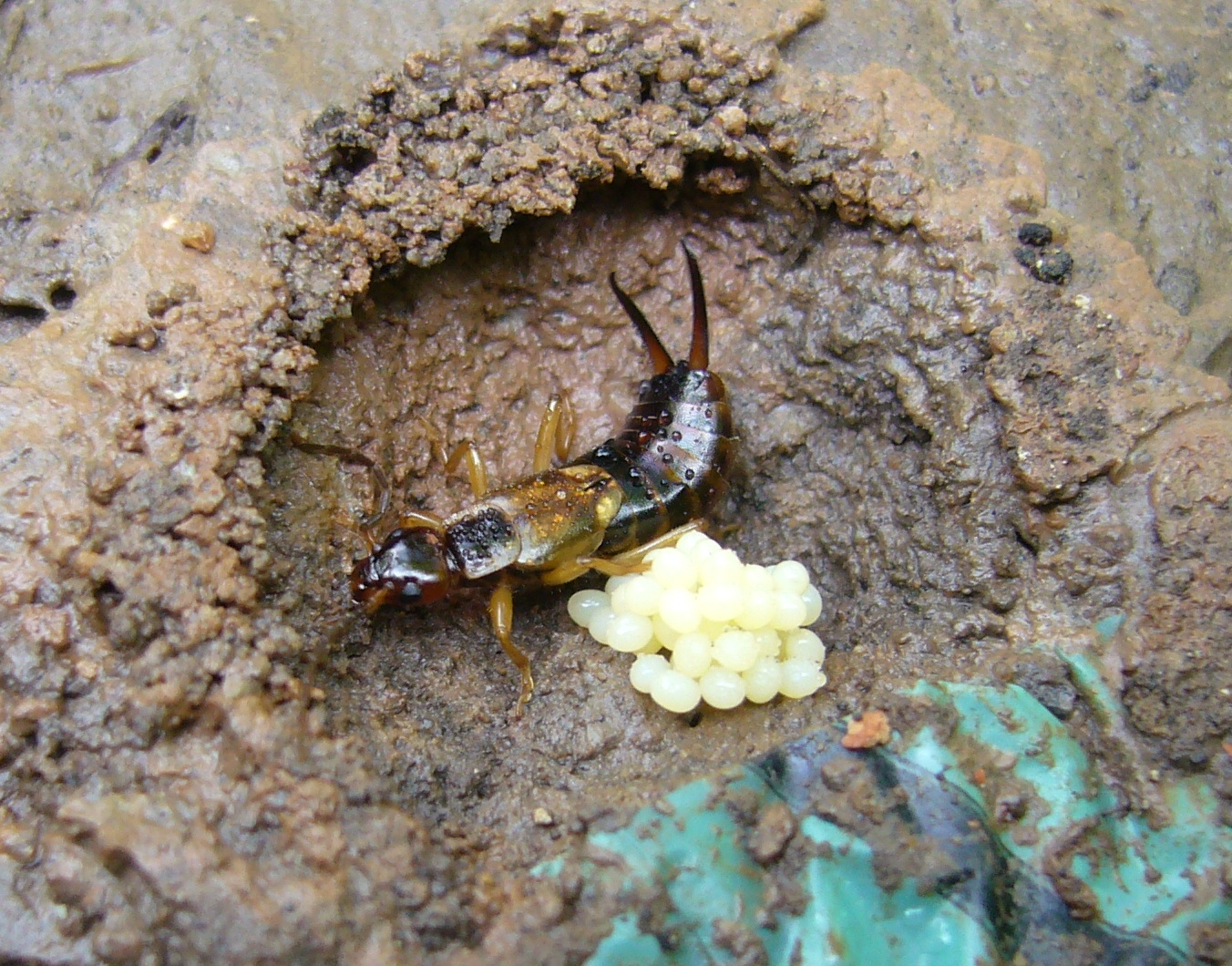
Female earwig in her nest, with eggs

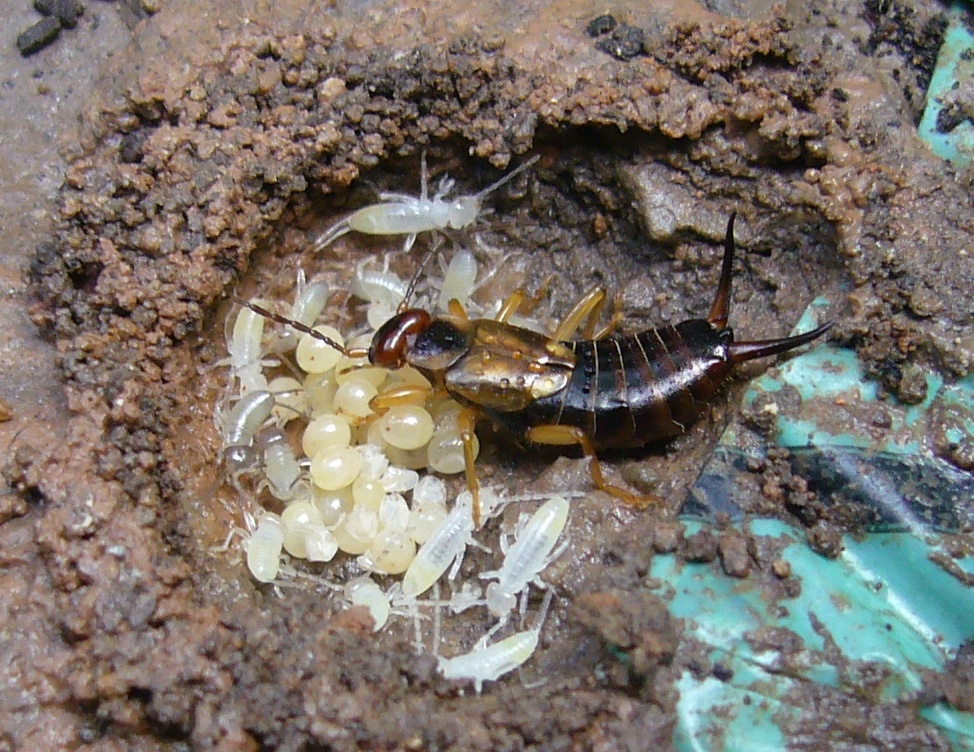
Female earwig in her nest with newly hatched young

The eggs hatch in about seven days. The mother may assist the nymphs in hatching. When the nymphs hatch, they eat the egg casing and continue to live with the mother. The nymphs look similar to their parents, only smaller, and will nest under their mother and she will continue to protect them until their second molt. The nymphs feed on food regurgitated by the mother, and on their own molts. If the mother dies before the nymphs are ready to leave, the nymphs may eat her.

After five to six instars, the nymphs will molt into adults. The male's forceps will become curved, while the females' forceps remain straight. They will also develop their natural color, which can be anything from a light brown (as in the tawny earwig) to a dark black (as in the ringlegged earwig). In species of winged earwigs, the wings will start to develop at this time. The forewings of an earwig are sclerotized to serve as protection for the membranous hindwings.

== Behavior ==
Most earwigs are nocturnal and inhabit small crevices, living in small amounts of debris, in various forms such as bark and fallen logs. Species have been found to be blind and living in caves, or cavernicolous, reported to be found on the island of Hawaii and in South Africa. Food typically consists of a wide array of living and dead plant and animal matter. For protection from predators, the species Doru taeniatum of earwigs can squirt foul-smelling yellow liquid in the form of jets from scent glands on the dorsal side of the third and fourth abdominal segment. It aims the discharges by revolving the abdomen, a maneuver that enables it simultaneously to use its pincers in defense. Under exceptional circumstances, earwigs form swarms and can take over significant areas of a district. In August 1755 they appeared in vast numbers near Stroud, Gloucestershire, UK, especially in the cracks and crevices of "old wooden buildings...so that they dropped out oftentimes in such multitudes as to literally cover the floor". A similar "plague" occurred in 2006, in and around a woodland cabin near the Blue Ridge Mountains of the eastern United States; it persisted through winter and lasted at least two years.

== Ecology ==
Earwigs are mostly scavengers, but some are omnivorous or predatory. The abdomen of the earwig is flexible and muscular. It is capable of maneuvering as well as opening and closing the forceps. The forceps are used for a variety of purposes. In some species, the forceps have been observed in use for holding prey, and in copulation. The forceps tend to be more curved in males than in females.

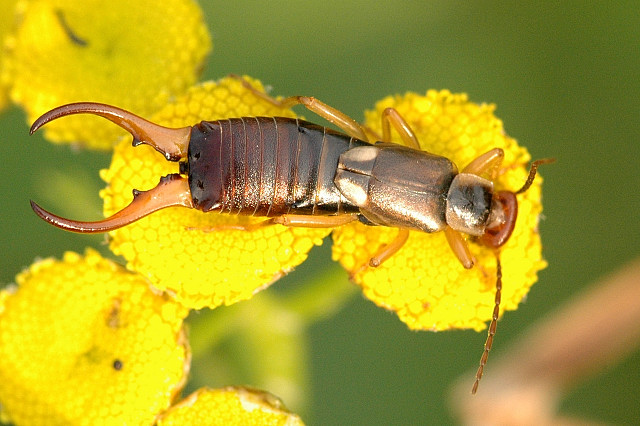
A male of Forficula auricularia feeding on flowers

The common earwig is an omnivore, eating plants and ripe fruit as well as actively hunting arthropods. To a large extent, this species is also a scavenger, feeding on decaying plant and animal matter if given the chance. Observed prey include largely plant lice, but also large insects such as bluebottle flies and woolly aphids. Plants that they feed on typically include clover, dahlias, zinnias, butterfly bush, hollyhock, lettuce, cauliflower, strawberry, blackberry, sunflowers, celery, peaches, plums, grapes, potatoes, roses, seedling beans and beets, and tender grass shoots and roots; they have also been known to eat corn silk, damaging the crop.

Species of the suborders Arixeniina and Hemimerina are generally considered epizoic, or living on the outside of other animals, mainly mammals. In the Arixeniina, family Arixeniidae, species of the genus Arixenia are normally found deep in the skin folds and gular pouch of Malaysian hairless bulldog bats (Cheiromeles torquatus), apparently feeding on bats' body or glandular secretions. On the other hand, species in the genus Xeniaria (still of the suborder Arixeniina) are believed to feed on the guano and possibly the guanophilous arthropods in the bat's roost, where it has been found. Hemimerina includes Araeomerus found in the nest of long-tailed pouch rats (Beamys), and Hemimerus which are found on giant Cricetomys rats.

Earwigs are generally nocturnal, and typically hide in small, dark, and often moist areas in the daytime. They can usually be seen on household walls and ceilings. Interaction with earwigs at this time results in a defensive free-fall to the ground followed by a scramble to a nearby cleft or crevice. During the summer they can be found around damp areas such as near sinks and in bathrooms. Earwigs tend to gather in shady cracks or openings or anywhere that they can remain concealed during daylight. Picnic tables, compost and waste bins, patios, lawn furniture, window frames, or anything with minute spaces (even artichoke blossoms) can potentially harbour them.

=== Predators and parasites ===
Earwigs are regularly preyed upon by birds, and like many other insect species they are prey for insectivorous mammals, amphibians, lizards, centipedes, assassin bugs, and spiders. European naturalists have observed bats preying upon earwigs. Their primary insect predators are parasitic species of Tachinidae, or tachinid flies, whose larvae are endoparasites. One species of tachinid fly, Triarthria setipennis, has been demonstrated to be successful as a biological control of earwigs for almost a century. Another tachinid fly and parasite of earwigs, Ocytata pallipes, has shown promise as a biological control agent as well. The common predatory wasp, the yellow jacket (Vespula maculifrons), preys upon earwigs when abundant. A small species of roundworm, Mermis nigrescens, is known to occasionally parasitize earwigs that have consumed roundworm eggs with plant matter. At least 26 species of parasitic fungus from the order Laboulbeniales have been found on earwigs. The eggs and nymphs are also cannibalized by other earwigs. A species of tyroglyphoid mite, Histiostoma polypori (Histiostomatidae, Astigmata), are observed on common earwigs, sometimes in great densities; however, this mite feeds on earwig cadavers and not its live earwig transportation. Hippolyte Lucas observed scarlet acarine mites on European earwigs.

== Evolution ==
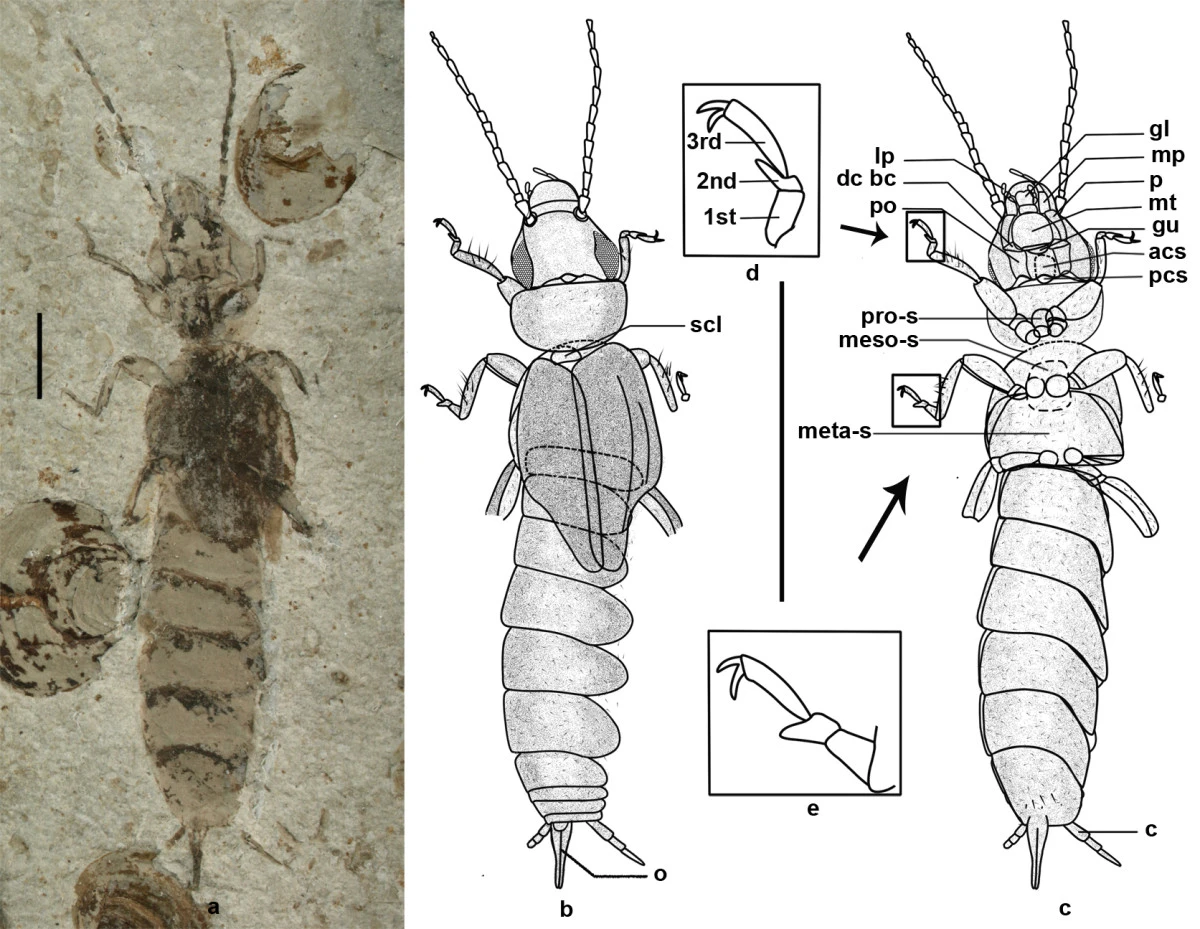
Fossil of Belloderma arcuata from the Middle Jurassic of China, a member of the extinct Eodermaptera

- - Phasmatodea
  - - Embioptera
    - - Orthoptera
      - - Notoptera
        - Dermaptera
          - †Archidermaptera
            - †Dermapteridae
            - †Protodiplatyidae
          - Eodermaptera
            - †Bellodermatidae
            - - †Semenoviolidae
              - †Turanodermatidae
              - Neodermaptera
                - Hemimerina
                - Arixeniina
                - Forficulina

Earwigs and their relatives

The fossil record of the Dermaptera starts in the Late Triassic to Early Jurassic period about 208 million years ago in England and Australia, and comprises about 70 specimens in the extinct suborder Archidermaptera. Some of the traits believed by neontologists to belong to modern earwigs are not found in the earliest fossils, but adults had five-segmented tarsi (the final segment of the leg), well developed ovipositors, veined tegmina (forewings) and long segmented cerci; in fact the pincers would not have been curled or used as they are now. The theorized stem group of the Dermaptera are the Protelytroptera, which are similar to modern Blattodea (cockroaches) with shell-like forewings and the large, unequal anal fan, are known from the Permian of North America, Europe and Australia. No fossils from the Triassic — during which Dermaptera would have evolved from Protelytroptera — have been found. The grouping of Protelytroptera and Dermaptera is called Dermapterida. Amongst the most frequently suggested order of insects to be the closest relatives of Dermaptera is Notoptera, theorized by Giles in 1963. However, other arguments have been made by other authors linking them to Phasmatodea, Embioptera, Plecoptera, and Dictyoptera. A 2012 mitochondrial DNA study suggested that this order is the sister to stoneflies of the order Plecoptera. A 2018 phylogenetic analysis found that their closest living relatives were angel insects of the order Zoraptera, with very high support.

Archidermaptera is believed to be sister to the remaining earwig groups, the extinct Eodermaptera and the living suborder Neodermaptera (= former suborders Forficulina, Hemimerina, and Arixeniina). The extinct suborders have tarsi with five segments (unlike the three found in Neodermaptera) as well as unsegmented cerci. No fossil Hemimeridae and Arixeniidae are known. Species in Hemimeridae were at one time in their own order, Diploglassata, Dermodermaptera, or Hemimerina. Like most other epizoic species, there is no fossil record, but they are probably no older than late Tertiary.

Some evidence of early evolutionary history is the structure of the antennal heart, a separate circulatory organ consisting of two ampullae, or vesicles, that are attached to the frontal cuticle near the bases of the antennae. These features have not been found in other insects. An independent organ exists for each antenna, consisting of an ampulla, attached to the frontal cuticle medial to the antenna base and forming a thin-walled sac with a valved ostium on its ventral side. They pump blood by elastic connective tissue, rather than muscle.

== Taxonomy ==
=== Distinguishing characteristics ===
The characteristics which distinguish the order Dermaptera from other insect orders are:

- General body shape: Elongate; dorso-ventrally flattened.
- Head: Prognathous. Antennae are segmented. Biting-type mouthparts. Ocelli absent. Compound eyes in most species, reduced or absent in some taxa.
- Appendages: Two pairs of wings normally present. The forewings are modified into short smooth, veinless tegmina. Hindwings are membranous and semicircular with veins radiating outwards.
- Abdomen: Cerci are unsegmented and resemble forceps. The ovipositor in females is reduced or absent.

The overwhelming majority of earwig species are in the former suborder Forficulina, grouped into nine families of 180 genera, including Forficula auricularia, the common European Earwig. Species within Forficulina are free-living, have functional wings and are not parasites. The cerci are unsegmented and modified into large, forceps-like structures.

The first epizoic species of earwig was discovered by a London taxidermist on the body of a Malaysian hairless bulldog bat in 1909, then described by Karl Jordan. By the 1950s, the two suborders Arixeniina and Hemimerina had been added to Dermaptera. These were subsequently demoted to family Arixeniidae and superfamily Hemimeroidea (with sole family Hemimeridae), respectively. They are now grouped together with the former Forficulina in the new suborder Neodermaptera.

Arixeniidae represents two genera, Arixenia and Xeniaria, with a total of five species in them. As with Hemimeridae, they are blind and wingless, with filiform segmented cerci. Hemimeridae are viviparous ectoparasites, preferring the fur of African rodents in either Cricetomys or Beamys genera. Hemimerina also has two genera, Hemimerus and Araeomerus, with a total of 11 species.

=== Phylogeny ===
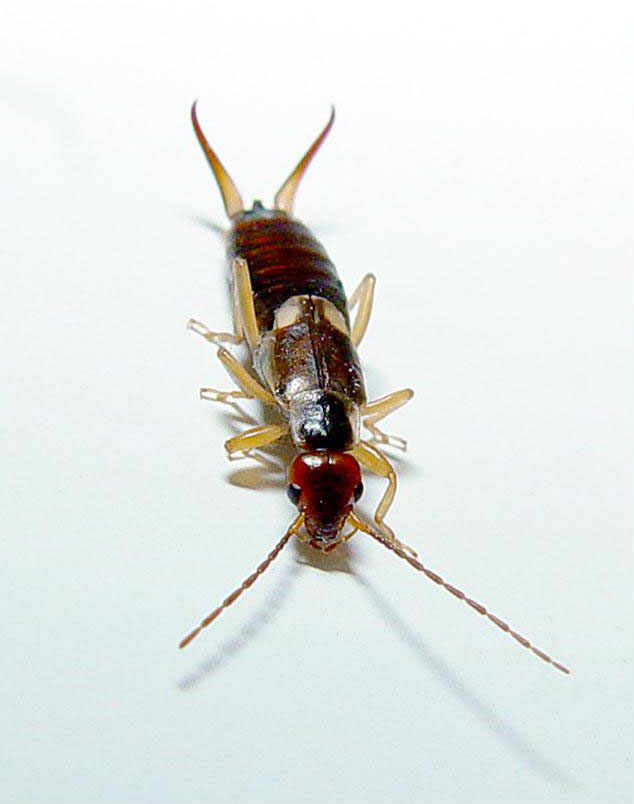
A female of the common earwig in a threat pose

Dermaptera is relatively small compared to the other orders of Insecta, with only about 2,000 species, 3 suborders and 15 families, including the extinct suborders Archidermaptera and Eodermaptera with their extinct families Protodiplatyidae, Dermapteridae, Semenoviolidae, and Turanodermatidae. The phylogeny of the Dermaptera is still debated. The extant Dermaptera appear to be monophyletic and there is support for the monophyly of the families Forficulidae, Chelisochidae, Labiduridae and Anisolabididae, however evidence has supported the conclusion that the former suborder Forficulina was paraphyletic through the exclusion of Hemimerina and Arixeniina which should instead be nested within the Forficulina. Thus, these former suborders were eliminated in the most recent higher classification.

== Relationship with humans ==
Earwigs are fairly abundant and are found in many areas around the world. There is no evidence that they transmit diseases to humans or other animals. Their pincers are commonly believed to be dangerous, but in reality, even the curved pincers of males cause little or no harm to humans. There have been several reports of earwigs crawling into human ears, though this is most likely only by chance and not an intentional behavior. They do not lay eggs inside the human body or human brain as is often erroneously claimed.

There is a debate whether earwigs are harmful or beneficial to crops, as they eat both the foliage and the insects eating such foliage, such as aphids, though it would take a large population to do considerable damage. The common earwig eats a wide variety of plants, and also a wide variety of foliage, including the leaves and petals. They have been known to cause economic losses in fruit and vegetable crops. Some examples are the flowers, hops, red raspberries, and corn crops in Germany, and in the south of France, earwigs have been observed feeding on peaches and apricots. The earwigs attacked mature plants and made cup-shaped bite marks 3–11 mm (1/8–7/16 in) in diameter.

== In literature and folklore ==
- One of the primary characters of James Joyce's experimental novel Finnegans Wake is referred to by the initials "HCE," which primarily stand for "Humphrey Chimpden Earwicker," a reference to earwigs. Earwig imagery is found throughout the book, and also occurs in the author's Ulysses in the Laestrygonians chapter.
- Oscar Cook wrote the short story (appearing in Switch On The Light, April, 1931; A Century Of Creepy Stories 1934; Pan Horror 2, 1960) "Boomerang", which was later adapted by Rod Serling for the Night Gallery TV-series episode, "The Caterpillar". It tells the tale of the use of an earwig as a murder instrument applied by a man obsessed with the wife of an associate.
- Thomas Hood discusses the myth of earwigs finding shelter in the human ear in the poem "Love Lane" by saying the following: "'Tis vain to talk of hopes and fears, / And hope the least reply to win, / From any maid that stops her ears / In dread of earwigs creeping in!"
- In some parts of rural England the earwig is called "battle-twig", which is present in Alfred, Lord Tennyson's poem The Spinster's Sweet-Arts: "'Twur as bad as battle-twig 'ere i' my oan blue chamber to me."
- In some regions of Japan, earwigs are called "Chinpo-Basami" or "Chinpo-Kiri", which means "penis cutter". Kenta Takada, a Japanese cultural entomologist, has inferred that these names may be derived from the fact that earwigs were seen around old Japanese-style toilets.
- In Roald Dahl's children's book George's Marvellous Medicine, George's Grandma encourages him to eat unwashed celery with beetles and earwigs still on them. "'A big fat earwig is very tasty,' Grandma said, licking her lips. 'But you've got to be very quick, my dear, when you put one of those in your mouth. It has a pair of sharp nippers on its back end and if it grabs your tongue with those, it never lets go. So you've got to bite the earwig first, chop chop, before it bites you.'"

== See also ==
- List of Orthopteroid genera containing species recorded in Europe
