= Northern voalavo =

Conservation status
- Least Concern (IUCN 3.1)

Scientific classification
- Kingdom: Animalia
- Phylum: Chordata
- Class: Mammalia
- Order: Rodentia
- Family: Nesomyidae
- Genus: Voalavo
- Species: V. gymnocaudus

Binomial name
- Voalavo gymnocaudus Carleton & Goodman, 1998
- Northern voalavo range

Rodent in the family Nesomyidae

The northern voalavo (Voalavo gymnocaudus), also known as the naked-tailed voalavo or simply the voalavo, is a rodent in the family Nesomyidae found in the Northern Highlands of Madagascar. Discovered in 1994 and formally described in 1998, it is the type species of the genus Voalavo; its closest relative is the eastern voalavo of the Central Highlands. DNA sequencing suggests that it may be more closely related to Grandidier's tufted-tailed rat than to other species of the closely related genus Eliurus. The northern voalavo is found at 1,250 to 1,950 m (4,100 to 6,400 ft) above sea level in montane wet and dry forests in the Marojejy and Anjanaharibe-Sud massifs. Nocturnal and solitary, it lives mainly on the ground, but it can climb and probably eats plant matter. Despite having a small range, the species is classified as being of least concern because it lacks obvious threats and much of its range is within protected areas.

The northern voalavo is a small, mouse-like rodent with soft, grey fur that is only slightly darker above than below. The ears are short and rounded. The long tail appears mostly naked and lacks a distinct tuft, which is present in Eliurus. It differs from the eastern voalavo mainly in the values of some measurements. The skull is delicate, with a long, narrow rostrum (front part), narrow interorbital region (between the eyes), and no development of ridges on the braincase. The molars are relatively high-crowned (hypsodont). It has a body mass of 17 to 25.5 g (0.60 to 0.90 oz).

== Taxonomy ==
The rodent fauna of the Northern Highlands of Madagascar remained almost totally unstudied until the 1990s. A 1994 survey of the Anjanaharibe-Sud Reserve partially filled this gap and led to the discovery of two new species: Grandidier's tufted-tailed rat and northern voalavo, the first known and type species of the genus Voalavo. Both species were formally described in 1998 by Michael Carleton and Steven Goodman. The generic name, Voalavo, is a general Malagasy word for rodent, and the specific name, gymnocaudus, refers to the naked tail, which distinguishes the northern voalavo from the related tufted-tailed rats (Eliurus). In 2000, the species was also recorded from the nearby Marojejy National Park.

Meanwhile, in 1999, Sharon Jansa and colleagues published a molecular phylogenetic study of the Nesomyinae, the native Malagasy rodents, using the mitochondrial gene cytochrome b. Their results suggested that the current definitions of Eliurus and Voalavo may not be correct, because they found that northern voalavo and Grandidier's tufted-tailed rat are more closely related to each other than to the remaining species of Eliurus. However, the DNA of Petter's tufted-tailed rat, a possible close relative of northern voalavo, could not be sampled, so Jansa and colleagues recommended further evaluation of the problem. According to a 2003 report, data from nuclear genes also support the relationship between northern voalavo and Grandidier's tufted-tailed rat, but Petter's tufted-tailed rat remains genetically unstudied and the taxonomic issue has not been resolved.

A second species of Voalavo, eastern voalavo, was named in 2005 from central Madagascar. Morphological differences between the two are subtle but consistent, and the cytochrome b sequences of the two species differ by about 10%. In mammals, closely related species regularly differ by less than 5% in their cytochrome b sequences, and a divergence of more than 5% within a single species suggests the presence of cryptic species.

== Description ==
=== External morphology ===
Measurements of northern voalavo
Locality	n	Head-body	Tail	Hindfoot	Ear	Mass
Anjanaharibe-Sud	4	86–90	119–120	20–21	–	20.5–23.5
Marojejy	5	80–90	113–126	17–20	15–15	17.0–25.5
n: Number of specimens measured. All measurements are in millimeters, except body mass in grams.

The northern voalavo is a small, mouse-like rodent. It differs from the very similar eastern voalavo mainly in some measurements, such as a greater tail length. It also resembles small species of Eliurus, but the fur is darker and there is no tail tuft. The fur is soft, short, and thick, and appears dark grey on most of the upperparts, but more brownish on the sides. On the back, the cover hairs, which form the main part of the fur, are three-colored: most of the hair is grey, followed by a narrow light buff band and a black tip. The longer guard hairs are black. The fur of the underparts is not different in overall color, but the individual hairs are gray for about three quarters of their length and white at the tips, except for those at the chin, which are white throughout.

The mystacial vibrissae (whiskers on the upper lips) reach the tips of the ears when pressed against the head. The short, rounded ears themselves are naked on the inside, but covered with short brown hairs on the outer surface. Females have three pairs of mammae. The digits and metapodials are mostly covered by white hairs. Short ungual tufts of hairs surrounding the bases of the claws are present. There are five pads on the forefeet and six on the hindfeet. On the hindfeet, the fifth digit is nearly as long as the middle three and the first (the hallux) is much shorter. The tail is longer than the head and body and appears naked for most of its length, but fine hairs are visible near the tip. Although the lower side is slightly lighter, there is no clear difference in coloration between the upper and lower sides. The skin of the tail is grey, and it is covered lightly by fine hairs that are dark brown over most of the length of the tail but white near the tip.

=== Skeleton ===
The skull is delicate and lightly built. The rostrum, the front part of the skull, is narrow and fairly long; it is shorter in eastern voalavo. The narrow zygomatic plate (a plate on the side of the skull) extends back to about the front of the first upper molar (M1). The zygomatic notch, a notch in the upper part of the zygomatic plate, is small. The zygomatic arches (cheekbones) are narrow, but as usual in nesomyines contain a relatively long jugal bone. The interorbital region (between the eyes) is narrow and short and lacks accessory shelves and ridges. The braincase also lacks such ridges.

The incisive foramina (openings in the front part of the palate) are medium in length, and do not reach the first molars. Their back margin is angular, not rounded as in eastern voalavo. The diastema (the gap between the upper incisors and molars) is shorter than in eastern voalavo. The bony palate is broad and lacks notable ridges and other features, except for a pair of foramina (openings) near the place where the first and second molars (M1 and M2) meet. The back border of the palate is at the level of the middle of the third molars (M3). In the bony roof of the mesopterygoid fossa, the opening behind the palate, wide sphenopalatine vacuities (openings) are present. A thin alisphenoid strut (a piece of bone on the lower side of the skull separating two foramina) is present in specimens from Marojejy, but not in those from Anjanaharibe-Sud. The tegmen tympani, the roof of the tympanic cavity, is reduced.

The root of the lower incisor is visible at the back of the mandible (lower jaw) as a slight protrusion; a true capsular process is absent. There are 13 thoracic (chest), 7 lumbar, 4 sacral, and 38 or 39 caudal (tail) vertebrae. The humerus (upper arm bone) lacks an entepicondylar foramen.

=== Dentition ===
The upper incisors are orthodont (with their cutting edge perpendicular to the plane formed by the molars) and have yellow to light orange enamel. On the lower incisor, the enamel contains series of fine ridges. The toothrows are longer than in eastern voalavo. As in Eliurus, the molars are incipiently hypsodont (high-crowned) and the individual cusps have lost their identities, having merged into transverse laminae not connected longitudinally. There are three laminae on each first and second molar, two on the third lower molar, and the laminae cannot be differentiated on the third upper molar. Although the first and second molars are similar to each other in size, the third (upper and lower) molars are conspicuously smaller. There are three roots below each upper and two below each lower molar.

== Distribution and ecology ==
The northern voalavo has been found only in two massifs of the Northern Highlands, Anjanaharibe-Sud and Marojejy, but may range more widely. At Anjanaharibe-Sud, the species has been found in wet mountain forest at 1,950 m (6,400 ft), where it occurred with the indigenous rodents Major's tufted-tailed rat and island mouse as well as the introduced black rat (Rattus rattus), and in drier forest at about 1,300 m (4,300 ft), where it may live alongside other species of Eliurus and Voalavoanala. The Marojejy records come from similar habitats at 1,250 to 1,875 m (4,101 to 6,152 ft) above sea level. The northern voalavo probably largely lives on the ground, but is able to climb in vegetation. It likes areas with dense networks of roots, among which it moves using runways and natural tunnels. The species is nocturnal (active during the night), is solitary, probably eats fruits and seeds, and bears up to three young per litter. A variety of parasitic arthropods have been recorded on northern voalavo: mites from the families Laelapidae and Trombiculidae (both Marojejy and Anjanaharibe-Sud), the demodecid mite Demodex (Marojejy only), the atopomelid mite Listrophoroides (both Marojejy and Anjanaharibe-Sud), and unidentified sucking lice (Anjanaharibe-Sud only). In 2007, a laelapid mite found on V. gymnocaudus in Anjanaharibe-Sud was described as a new species, Andreacarus voalavo. The apicomplexan parasite Eimeria has also been recorded in Anjanaharibe-Sud.

== Conservation status ==
Although it has a small range and is uncommon even within that range, no major threats are known and virtually all of its distribution is within protected areas. The species is therefore classified as "Least Concern" on the IUCN Red List.
