= Voalavo =

Scientific classification
- Kingdom: Animalia
- Phylum: Chordata
- Class: Mammalia
- Order: Rodentia
- Family: Nesomyidae
- Subfamily: Nesomyinae
- Genus: Voalavo; Carleton & Goodman, 1998

Type species
- Voalavo gymnocaudus Carleton & Goodman, 1998

Species
- Voalavo antsahabensis; Voalavo gymnocaudus
- Known localities of V. gymnocaudus (red) and V. antsahabensis (green)

Genus of rodents from Madagascar

Voalavo is a genus of rodent in the subfamily Nesomyinae, found only in Madagascar. Two species are known, both of which occur in mountain forest above 1250 m (4100 ft) altitude; the northern voalavo lives in northern Madagascar and the eastern voalavo is restricted to a small area in the central part of the island. The genus was discovered in 1994 and formally described in 1998. Within Nesomyinae, it is most closely related to the genus Eliurus, and DNA sequence data suggest that the current definitions of these two genera need to be changed.

Species of Voalavo are small, gray, mouse-like rodents, among the smallest nesomyines. They lack the distinctive tuft of long hairs on the tail that is characteristic of Eliurus. The tail is long and females have six mammae. In Voalavo, there are two glands on the chest (absent in Eliurus) that produce a sweet-smelling musk in breeding males. In the skull, the facial skeleton is long and the braincase is smooth. The incisive foramina (openings in the front part of the palate) are long and the bony palate itself is smooth. The molars are somewhat hypsodont (high-crowned), though less so than in Eliurus, and the third molars are reduced in size and complexity.

== Taxonomy ==
A specimen of the genus was first collected in 1994 in Anjanaharibe-Sud, northern Madagascar. The genus was named Voalavo in 1998 by Michael Carleton and Steven Goodman, with a single species, the type northern voalavo, restricted to the Northern Highlands of Madagascar. The generic name Voalavo is a Malagasy word for "rodent". A second species, eastern voalavo, was named by Goodman and colleagues in 2005 from the region of Anjozorobe in the Central Highlands. The two Voalavo species are closely related and quite similar, but differ in various subtle morphological characters (mainly measurements) and by 10% in the sequence of the mitochondrial gene cytochrome b.

Voalavo is part of the subfamily Nesomyinae, which includes nine genera that are all restricted to Madagascar. Before the discoveries of Monticolomys (published in 1996) and Voalavo (1998), all of the known genera within Nesomyinae were quite distinct from each other, so much so that phylogenetic relationships among them long remained obscure. Like Monticolomys (closely related to Macrotarsomys), however, Voalavo shows clear similarities to another nesomyine genus, Eliurus. In their description of Voalavo, Carleton and Goodman argued that, although closely related, Eliurus and Voalavo form separate monophyletic groups; but a 1999 molecular phylogenetic study by Sharon Jansa and colleagues, who compared cytochrome b sequences among nesomyines and other rodents, found that northern voalavo was more closely related to Grandidier's tufted-tailed rat than to other species of Eliurus. This finding called into question the separate generic status of Voalavo. However, tissue samples of Petter's tufted-tailed rat, a species that is thought to be closely related to Grandidier's tufted-tailed rat, were not available, so this species could not be included in the study. Data from nuclear genes also supports the relationship between northern voalavo and Grandidier's tufted-tailed rat, but Petter's tufted-tailed rat remains genetically unstudied and the taxonomic issue has not been resolved.

Molecular phylogenetic analysis of nuclear DNA supports a close relationship between Eliurus, Voalavo, and two other nesomyine genera, Gymnuromys and Brachytarsomys. These genera are more distantly related to the other nesomyine genera and even more distantly to the other subfamilies of the family Nesomyidae, which occur in mainland Africa.

== Description ==
Measurements of Voalavo
Locality	n	Head-body	Tail	Hindfoot	Ear	Mass
Anjanaharibe-Sud (V. gymnocaudus)	4	86–90	119–120	20–21	–	20.5–23.5
Marojejy (V. gymnocaudus)	5	80–90	113–126	17–20	15–15	17.0–25.5
Anjozorobe (V. antsahabensis)	4	86–91	106–119	19–21	15–16	20.7–22.6
n: Number of specimens measured. All measurements are in millimeters, except body mass in grams.

Voalavo is a small rodent resembling a mouse with gray fur. Species of the genus are among the smallest known nesomyines, close in size only to Monticolomys koopmani. In terms of external morphology, Voalavo is barely different from Eliurus; fur coloration patterns, general morphology of the feet, and number of mammae (six) are all the same in both genera. However, all species of Eliurus have a pronounced tuft of elongated hairs at the tip of the tail, a feature that is absent in Voalavo, although the latter does have slightly longer hairs near the tip. The tail is longer than the head and body. Relative tail length in northern voalavo (136% of head and body length) is comparable to that of the longest-tailed species of Eliurus, Grandidier's tufted-tailed rat and Petter's tufted-tailed rat, but V. antsahabensis has a somewhat shorter tail. Furthermore, the pads of the feet are larger in Eliurus, and specifically, the thenar pad (located at the middle of the tarsus) is circular and fairly small in Voalavo, but longer and larger in Eliurus. On the chest, Voalavo species have a gland that produces a sweet-swelling musk in breeding males; this gland is absent in Eliurus. Unlike all other nesomyines but Brachyuromys, Voalavo lacks an entepicondylar foramen, an opening on the humerus (upper forelimb bone).

The skull of Voalavo also resembles that of Eliurus, with a long facial skeleton, an hourglass-shaped interorbital region (between the eyes), and a smooth interorbital region and braincase, without ridges or shelves. Other shared characteristics include an essentially featureless bony palate, without many pits and ridges, and a broad mesopterygoid fossa (the opening behind the palate). In other characteristics, Voalavo resembles some but not all species of Eliurus. For example, the length of the incisive foramina matches the maximum seen in Eliurus species (in this case, in Major's tufted-tailed rat and White-tipped tufted-tailed rat). The back margin of the incisive foramen is rounded in eastern voalavo, but angular in northern voalavo. The two species also differ in the shape of the suture (dividing line) between the maxillary and palatine bones, which is straight in eastern voalavo, but more curved in northern voalavo. The capsular process, a projection at the back of the mandible (lower jaw) that houses the root of the lower incisor, is indistinct in Voalavo, a feature it shares with Grandidier's tufted-tailed rat, Major's tufted-tailed rat, and Petter's tufted-tailed rat, but not the other species of Eliurus.

Other features of the skull distinguish the two genera. The tegmen tympani, the roof of the tympanic cavity, is much reduced in Voalavo relative to Eliurus. The subsquamosal fenestrae, openings in the squamosal bone at the back of the skull, are larger in Voalavo than in Eliurus. The zygomatic plate, a plate at the sides of the skull that roots the front part of the zygomatic arches (cheekbones), is narrower in Voalavo, and lacks a clear zygomatic notch (a notch formed by a projection at the front of the zygomatic plate), which is present in Eliurus. Among nesomyines, only Brachytarsomys has a more reduced zygomatic notch.

Like Eliurus, Voalavo has moderately high-crowned (hypsodont) molars with crowns that consist not of discrete cusps, but of transverse laminae (plates) that generally lack longitudinal connections. However, Eliurus molars are slightly more hypsodont than those of Voalavo. The third upper and lower molars are smaller relative to the second molars in Voalavo than in Eliurus. Perhaps as a consequence, the upper third molar lacks discrete laminae in Voalavo, and the lower third molar has only two laminae (three in Eliurus). There are three roots under each upper molar and two under each lower.

== Distribution and ecology ==
Both species of Voalavo occur in montane forest. Northern voalavo is restricted to the Northern Highlands, where it is found at 1,250–1,950 m (4,100–6,400 ft) altitude in Marojejy and Anjanaharibe-Sud. The known range of eastern voalavo is restricted to the vicinity of Anjozorobe at 1,250–1,425 m (4,101–4,675 ft) altitude. Although most of the 450 km (280 mi) between the ranges of the two species consists of montane forest—suitable habitat for Voalavo—the area is bisected by the low-lying Mandritsara Window, which may serve as a barrier between the two species. Subfossil remains of Voalavo have been found in the former Mahajanga Province (northwestern Madagascar).

Very little is known of the ecology of eastern voalavo, but northern voalavo is thought to be largely terrestrial with some scansorial (tree-climbing) abilities. It is active during the night, bears up to three young per litter, and probably eats fruits and seeds. Various parasites have been recorded on northern voalavo, including mites and Eimeria.

== Conservation status ==
Because eastern voalavo has a small range that is threatened by the practice of slash-and-burn agriculture (known in Madagascar as tavy), it is listed on the IUCN Red List as "Endangered". Although V. gymnocaudus also has a small range, it is mostly within protected areas, and this species is therefore listed as "Least Concern".
