= Andreacarus voalavo =

Scientific classification
- Kingdom: Animalia
- Phylum: Arthropoda
- Subphylum: Chelicerata
- Class: Arachnida
- Order: Mesostigmata
- Family: Laelapidae
- Genus: Andreacarus
- Species: A. voalavo

Binomial name
- Andreacarus voalavo Dowling et al., 2007

Species of mite

Andreacarus voalavo is a parasitic mite found on the Malagasy rodent Voalavo gymnocaudus. First described in 2007, it is closely related to Andreacarus gymnuromys and Andreacarus eliurus, which are found on other Malagasy rodents. The length of the idiosoma, the main body, is 630 to 670 μm in females and 450 to 480 μm in males. Unlike A. eliurus, this species lacks distinct sternal glands (secretory organs) between two lyrifissures (sensory organs) on the lower part of the female body. The pilus dentilis, a sensory organ on the chelicera, is serrate, which distinguishes it from A. gymnuromys. Females of A. gymnuromys also have a less ornamented sternal shield (covering part of the underparts) and shorter setae (bristles) on the upperparts.

== Taxonomy and ecology ==
Andreacarus voalavo was named in 2007 by Ashley Dowling, Andre Bochkov, and Barry OConnor on the basis of 15 specimens found on an individual of the rodent Voalavo gymnocaudus that was collected in 1994 in the Anjanaharibe-Sud Reserve in northern Madagascar. The specific name, voalavo, is taken from the generic name of the type host. Voalavo gymnocaudus, the only known host, is only found in the Anjanaharibe-Sud and Marojejy massifs of the Malagasy Northern Highlands. A. voalavo is closely related to Andreacarus gymnuromys and Andreacarus eliurus, found on other Malagasy rodents. They are members of the genus Andreacarus, which currently includes 11 species found on rodents and other small mammals in Madagascar and mainland Africa.

== Description ==
In the female, the pilus dentilis, a sensory organ on the chelicera (mouthpart), is serrate, not smooth as in A. gymnuromys. The idiosoma (main part of the body) is 630 to 670 μm long and 370 to 435 μm wide and the dorsal shield (covering the upper side) is 620 to 655 μm long and 360 to 370 μm wide. The dorsal setae (bristles) are long relative to A. gymnuromys. The sternal shield (on the lower side of the body) is 115 to 125 μm long and 184 to 200 μm wide and is more ornamented than in A. gymnuromys. Unlike A. eliurus, A. voalavo lacks distinct sternal glands (secretory organs) between the lyrifissures (sensory organs) iv1 and iv2 on the lower side of the body. The other shields on the lower side of the body are the genitoventral shield (232 to 253 by 170 to 182 μm), the peritrematic shield (16 to 18 μm wide in its posterior part), and the anal shield (140 to 147 by 117 to 127 μm). On the soft part of the cuticle, there are nine pairs of setae. The first segments of the legs, the coxae, lack hooks. On the coxae of the third pair of legs, the setae at the back are spur-like.

The idiosoma of the male is 450 to 480 μm long and 270 to 300 μm wide, the dorsal shield is 440 to 475 by 250 to 270 μm, and the holoventral shield is 360 to 395 μm and 189 to 207 μm wide.
