= Andreacarus =

Scientific classification
- Kingdom: Animalia
- Phylum: Arthropoda
- Subphylum: Chelicerata
- Class: Arachnida
- Order: Mesostigmata
- Family: Laelapidae
- Genus: Andreacarus; Radford, 1953

Genus of mites

Andreacarus is a genus of mites in the family Laelapidae that are parasitic on small mammals and earwigs in Africa and Madagascar. A number of Australian and New Guinean species were formerly included in the genus, but are now placed in a separate genus Juxtalaelaps.

The genus includes the following species:

- Andreacarus brachyuromys Dowling et al., 2007 (on the rodent Brachyuromys in Madagascar)
- Andreacarus eliurus Dowling et al., 2007 (on the rodent Eliurus in Madagascar)
- Andreacarus galidia Dowling et al., 2007 (on the carnivoran Galidia in Madagascar)
- Andreacarus gymnuromys Dowling et al., 2007 (on the rodent Gymnuromys in Madagascar)
- Andreacarus hemicentetes Fain, 1991 (on the tenrec Hemicentetes in Madagascar)
- Andreacarus matthyssei Fain, 1991 (on the rodent Cricetomys in Nigeria)
- Andreacarus petersi Radford, 1953 (on the rodents Cricetomys, Arvicanthis, and Mastomys and the earwig Hemimerus in mainland Africa)
- Andreacarus nesomys Dowling et al., 2007 (on the rodent Nesomys in Madagascar)
- Andreacarus tenrec Dowling et al., 2007 (on the tenrec Tenrec in Madagascar)
- Andreacarus voalavo Dowling et al., 2007 (on the rodent Voalavo in Madagascar)
- Andreacarus zumpti Taufflieb, 1956 (on Cricetomys in mainland Africa)
