= Malagasy mountain mouse =

Conservation status
- Least Concern (IUCN 3.1)

Scientific classification
- Kingdom: Animalia
- Phylum: Chordata
- Class: Mammalia
- Order: Rodentia
- Family: Nesomyidae
- Subfamily: Nesomyinae
- Genus: Monticolomys; Carleton & Goodman, 1996
- Species: M. koopmani

Binomial name
- Monticolomys koopmani Carleton & Goodman, 1996
- Known collection localities of Monticolomys koopmani

Small rodent found in the highlands of eastern Madagascar

The Malagasy mountain mouse or Koopman's montane voalavo (Monticolomys koopmani) is a rodent in the subfamily Nesomyinae of the family Nesomyidae. It is monotypic within the genus Monticolomys, and is closely related to the big-footed mouse (Macrotarsomys). It is found in the highlands of eastern Madagascar. This small, mouse-like rodent is dark brown on its upperparts and dark gray on its underparts. It has small, rounded, densely haired ears and broad feet with well-developed pads. The long tail lacks a tuft at the tip. The skull is delicate and lacks crests and ridges on its roof.

First collected in 1929, the Malagasy mountain mouse was not formally described until 1996, but it is now known to have a broad distribution. Active during the night, it occurs in both montane forest and human-disturbed grasslands and feeds on fruits and seeds. A scansorial animal, it climbs trees but also lives on the ground. Although habitat destruction may pose a threat, it is classified as "Least Concern" on the IUCN Red List.

== Taxonomy ==
A specimen was captured in 1929 during the Mission Zoologique Franco-Anglo-Américaine to Madagascar, but the rodents obtained by the expedition were never studied in detail. It was not until the 1970s that Karl Koopman and Guy Musser recognized that the animal—whose skin had landed at the American Museum of Natural History in New York, while the skull was at the Muséum national d'histoire naturelle in Paris—represented an otherwise unknown species. However, they never published their results. In 1993, Steven Goodman rediscovered the species on Madagascar and in 1996 he and Michael Carleton finally published a formal description. They named the animal Monticolomys koopmani, as the sole member of a new genus. The generic name Monticolomys means "mountain-dwelling mouse" and refers to the animal's montane habitat, and the specific name koopmani honors Karl Koopman for his many contributions to mammalian systematics. Common names in use for the animal also include "Koopman's montane voalavo" and "Malagasy mountain mouse".

The indigenous rodents of Madagascar, the Nesomyinae, prior to the discovery of Monticolomys comprised seven very distinctive genera—so distinct from each other that some have found it difficult to accept that they are closely related. Monticolomys, however, does not follow this pattern, in that it is similar and closely related to the gerbil-like genus Macrotarsomys of western Madagascar. This relationship was originally proposed by Goodman and Carleton based on morphology, and was strongly supported by a DNA sequence analysis (based on the cytochrome b gene) published in 1999. While this study provided some weak support for a relationship between the Macrotarsomys–Monticolomys clade and the giant jumping rat, Hypogeomys, a later study based on the IRBP gene instead placed Macrotarsomys–Monticolomys sister to a clade containing four other nesomyine genera—Eliurus, Voalavo, Gymnuromys, and Brachytarsomys.

== Description ==
The Malagasy mountain mouse is a small, mouse-like rodent, and quite different in appearance from most other nesomyines. It has a thick, soft fur, which appears dark brown on the upperparts. The cover hairs (which comprise most of the fur) are tricolored: for the basal two-thirds of their length, they are plumbeous gray; the middle is ochraceous; and the tip is dark brown to black. The longer guard hairs, which are most common towards the middle of the back, are completely black. The fur of the underparts appears dark gray and is not sharply demarcated from the upperparts. There, the hairs are also plumbeous at the bases, but the tips range from white to yellowish-brown. The mystacial vibrissae—whiskers above the mouth—are medium-sized. The short, rounded ears are densely covered with grayish hairs. Monticolomys has broad hindfeet bearing prominent pads and long outer digits. There are white hairs on the upper sides of the metapodials and digits, and long ungual tufts—tufts of hair surrounding the bases of the claws—are present. The thumb of the forefeet bears a nail, but claws are present on the other digits. The long tail is covered with small scales and light brown hairs. The tail lacks a distinct tuft at the tip, as is present in Eliurus and Macrotarsomys. Females have six mammae. Head and body length is 84 to 101 mm (3.3 to 4.0 in), tail length is 116 to 143 mm (4.6 to 5.6 in), hindfoot length is 23 to 25 mm (0.91 to 0.98 in), ear length is 15 to 20 mm (0.59 to 0.79 in), and body mass is 18.5 to 27.5 g (0.65 to 0.97 oz).

The skull is small and delicate. The front part, the rostrum, is narrow and relatively long. The nasal bones are rounded at the front, but blunt at the back. The zygomatic plate—a bony plate at the side of the skull—is narrow and extends back to the front margin of the first upper molar (M1). The jugal bones constitute much of the thin zygomatic arches (cheekbones). The interorbital region, between the eyes, is narrow and hourglass-shaped. There are no crests or ridges on the interorbital region or on the braincase. The incisive foramina, openings in the front part of the palate, extend back to a point between the front roots of the M1s. The bony palate itself is broad and lacks many indentations and protuberances present in other species. Its posterior margin is at the level of the upper third molars (M3s). There is no alisphenoid strut, so that the masticatory-buccinator foramen and the foramen ovale accessorium, two openings on the underside of the skull, are fused. There are 13 thoracic (chest), 7 lumbar (abdomen), 4 sacral (hip), and 38 caudal (tail) vertebrae.

The upper incisors have orange enamel and are opisthodont, with the cutting edge of the tooth inclined backwards. The root of the lower incisors extends though the mandible (lower jaw) to a low capsular process at the back of the jawbone. The molars are brachyodont (low-crowned) and bear distinct cusps. The second molars, although decidedly smaller than the first, are similar in their crown morphology, but the much smaller third molars are reduced and more distinct from the first molars in morphology. The molars lack accessory crests and other features. Each of the upper molars is three-rooted, whereas the lowers have two roots. The molars are quite similar to those of Macrotarsomys, and differ only in minor details.

== Distribution and ecology ==
The species' range is now known to extend across the mountain ranges of eastern Madagascar from the Tsaratanana Massif south to Andohahela, at 800 to 2,200 m (2,600 to 7,200 ft) above sea level. It occurs in montane forest, but also in degraded grassland, where it is among the first species to return after fires. At Ankaratra, where the species was recorded in 1929, it occurred in such grassland, where the nesomyine Brachyuromys betsileoensis was also found. The animal was again recorded at Ankaratra in 1996, this time in a heavily disturbed forest, where it occurred with Eliurus minor and the introduced black rat (Rattus rattus). At Andringitra, the animal was recorded in high montane forest together with six other nesomyines—Brachyuromys ramirohitra, Eliurus minor, Eliurus tanala, Eliurus webbi, Gymnuromys roberti, and Nesomys rufus—as well as the black rat. At Andohahela, Monticolomys was found at an altitude of 1,875 m (6,152 ft) in sclerophyllous forest. Its distribution corresponds to the High Mountain Domain, a region defined on the basis of plant distributions. This region is now discontinuous, but the High Mountain Domain habitat was continuous from mountain to mountain as recently as the early Holocene. Subfossil remains have been found in Mahajanga Province (northwestern Madagascar). Malagasy mountain mouse is morphologically uniform across its wide distribution.

The Malagasy mountain mouse is nocturnal and solitary and produces litters of up to three offspring. It is scansorial, spending time on the ground but also climbing in vegetation. In Andringitra, two specimens were captured on a liana 2 m (6.6 ft) over the ground, and a third was caught on the ground together with two shrew tenrecs (Microgale taiva). All five specimens from Andohahela were trapped on the ground, as was the specimen caught in Ankaratra in 1996. Its diet includes fruits and seeds; in captivity, it eats Agarista fruits.

== Conservation status ==
As Malagasy mountain mouse is now known to be a widespread, common species occurring in at least one protected area (Andringitra National Park; it may also occur in Ankarana Special Reserve), it is listed on the IUCN Red List as "Least Concern". However, fires pose a threat in montane forest and, at lower elevations, its habitat is being converted into agricultural land.

== Literature cited ==
- Carleton, M.D. and Goodman, S.M. (1996). "Systematic studies of Madagascar's endemic rodents (Muroidea: Nesomyinae): A new genus and species from the Central Highlands". Fieldiana Zoology 85:231–250
- Goodman, S.M., Rakotondravony, D., Schatz, G. and Wilmé, L. (1996). "Species richness of forest-dwelling birds, rodents and insectivores in a planted forest of native trees: a test case from the Ankaratra, Madagascar". Ecotropica 2:109–120
- Goodman, S.M., Carleton, M.D. and Pidgeon, M. (1999). "Rodents of the Réserve Naturelle Intégrale d'Andohahela, Madagascar". Fieldiana Zoology 94:217–249
- Goodman, S.M., Ganzhorn, J.U. and Rakotondravony, D. (2003). "Introduction to the mammals". pp. 1159–1186 in Goodman, S.M. and Benstead, J.P. (eds.). The Natural History of Madagascar. University of Chicago Press, 1728 pp. ISBN 0-226-30306-3
- Jansa, S.A., Goodman, S.M. and Tucker, P.K. (1999). "Molecular phylogeny and biogeography of the native rodents of Madagascar (Muridae: Nesomyinae): A test of the single-origin hypothesis". Cladistics 15:253–270 doi:10.1111/j.1096-0031.1999.tb00267.x
- Jansa, S.A. and Weksler, M. (2004). "Phylogeny of muroid rodents: relationships within and among major lineages as determined by IRBP gene sequences" Molecular Phylogenetics and Evolution 31:256–276 doi:10.1016/j.ympev.2003.07.002 PMID 15019624
- Kennerley, R. (2016). "Monticolomys koopmani". IUCN Red List of Threatened Species. 2016 e.T136539A22233042. doi:10.2305/IUCN.UK.2016-3.RLTS.T136539A22233042.en.
- Maminirina, C.P., Goodman, S.M. and Raxworthy, C.J. (2008). "Les micro-mammifères (Mammalia, Rodentia, Afrosoricida et Soricomorpha) du massif du Tsaratanana et biogéographie des forêts de montagne de Madagascar". Zoosystema 30(3):695–721 (in French)
- Mein, P., Sénégas, F., Gommery, D., Ramanivosoa, B., Randrianantenaina, H. and Kerloc'h, P. (2010). "Nouvelles espèces subfossiles de rongeurs du Nord-Ouest de Madagascar". Comptes Rendus Palevol 9(3):101–112 (in French, with abridged English version). (subscription required)
- Musser, G. G.; Carleton, M. D. (2005). "Superfamily Muroidea". In Wilson, D. E.; Reeder, D. M. (eds.). Mammal Species of the World: A Taxonomic and Geographic Reference (3rd ed.). Johns Hopkins University Press. p. 952. ISBN 978-0-8018-8221-0. OCLC 62265494.
- Rasolonondrasana, B.P.N. and Goodman, S.M. (2006). "The influence of fire on mountain sclerophyllous forests and their small-mammal communities in Madagascar". pp. 77–87 in Spehn, E.M., Liberman, M. and Körner, C. (eds.). Land Use Change and Mountain Biodiversity. Boca Raton, Florida: CRC Press, 361 pp. ISBN 978-0-8493-3523-5
