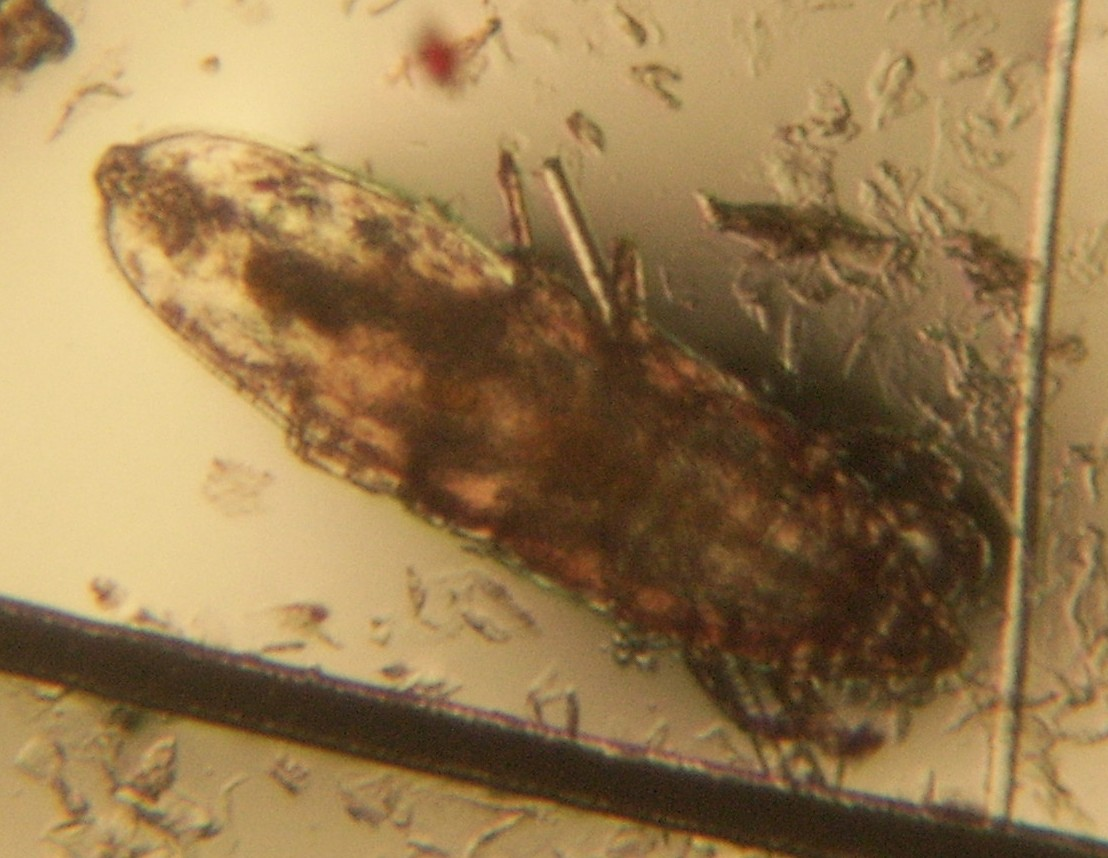

Scientific classification
- Domain: Eukaryota
- Kingdom: Animalia
- Phylum: Arthropoda
- Subphylum: Chelicerata
- Class: Arachnida
- Order: Sarcoptiformes
- Family: Atopomelidae
- Genus: Chirodiscoides
- Species: C. caviae

Binomial name
- Chirodiscoides caviae Hirst, 1917

= Chirodiscoides caviae =

Species of mite

Chirodiscoides caviae is a species of mites belonging to the family Atopomelidae. The species is often called fur mites and could cause infestations with guinea pigs. These mites are found in Europe and America. The species was discovered by A.S.Hirst in 1917.

== Description ==
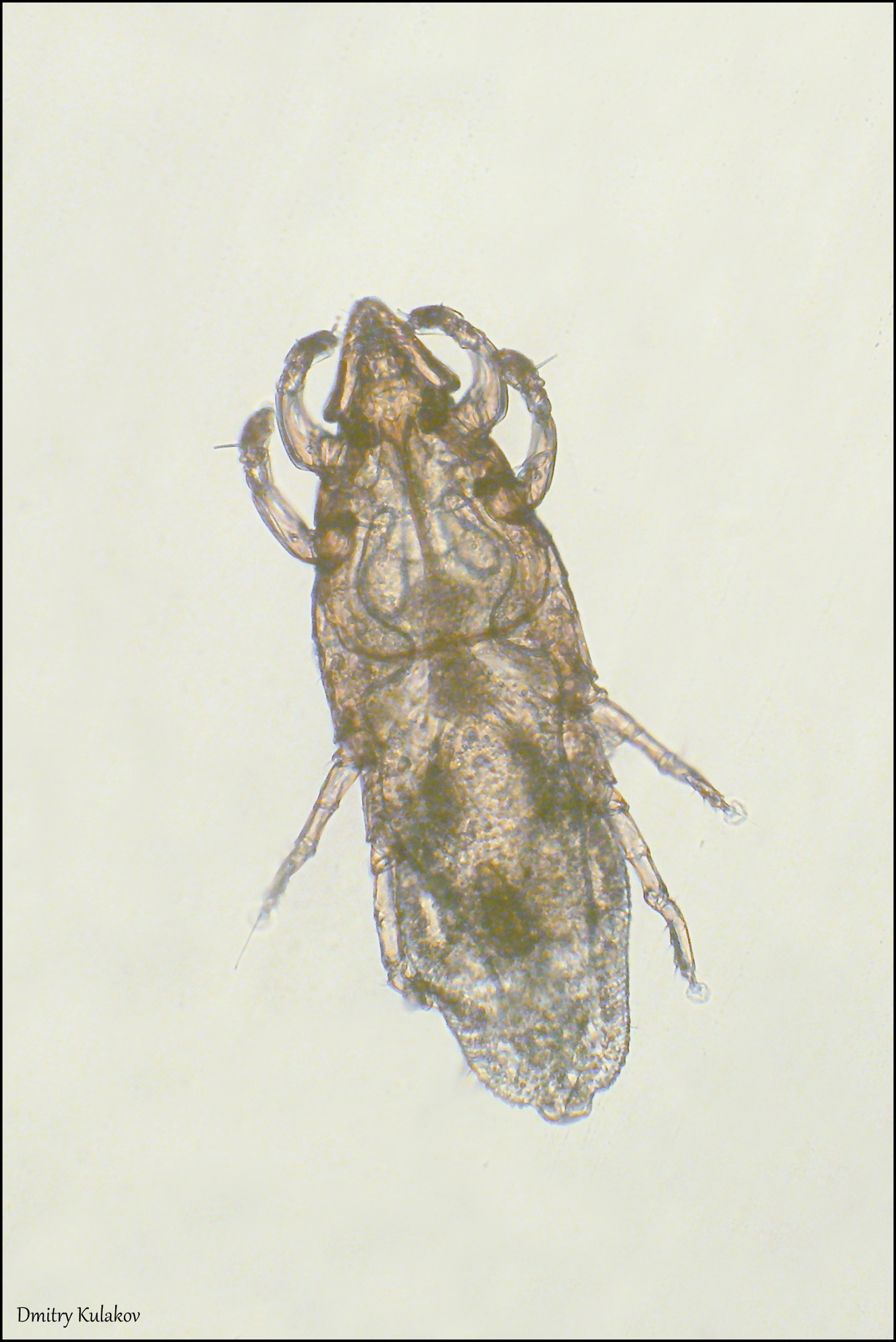
Female chirodiscoides caviae

The adults range in sizes of 350-500 micrometers, and females are bigger than males. To the naked eye the species is invisible. The males have a longer and a more curved posterior part while the females have a triangle shaped posterior part. Females and males both have an invisible stigma, a small pedipalps, a triangle rostrum, and have 4 pairs of legs. The larva and nymphs have similar morphology except in size and leg pairs. The larva and nymphs have 3 leg pairs rather than 4 leg pairs. The legs of the species have suction cups or claws at the bottom of the leg. The suction cups have a small pedicle and are carried by the pedicle.
