= Chirodiscoides =

Scientific classification
- Kingdom: Animalia
- Phylum: Arthropoda
- Subphylum: Chelicerata
- Class: Arachnida
- Order: Sarcoptiformes
- Family: Atopomelidae
- Genus: Chirodiscoides; Hirst, 1917

Genus of mites

Chirodiscoides is a genus of mites belonging to the family Atopomelidae.

The species of this genus are found in Europe and America.

Species:

- Chirodiscoides caviae Hirst, 1917
- Chirodiscoides proechimys Fain, 1972
