= Eastern voalavo =

Conservation status
- Endangered (IUCN 3.1)

Scientific classification
- Kingdom: Animalia
- Phylum: Chordata
- Class: Mammalia
- Order: Rodentia
- Family: Nesomyidae
- Genus: Voalavo
- Species: V. antsahabensis

Binomial name
- Voalavo antsahabensis Goodman et al., 2005
- Known records of Voalavo antsahabensis (green) and Voalavo gymnocaudus (red)

Species of rodent endemic to Madagascar

The eastern voalavo (Voalavo antsahabensis) is a rodent in the family Nesomyidae which occurs in the Anjozorobe forest of eastern Madagascar. Although surveys before 2002 failed to record the species, it is common in some places. However, it is threatened by habitat loss because of slash-and-burn agriculture. The species was formally described in 2005 and is most closely related to the only other species of Voalavo, the northern voalavo from northern Madagascar.

The two species of Voalavo are only subtly different in morphology. With a body mass of 20.7 to 22.6 g (0.73 to 0.80 oz), the eastern voalavo is a small rodent. It has a longer tail than the northern voalavo, as well as a longer rostrum (front part of the skull) and diastema (gap between the incisors and molars), but shorter molar rows. The two species also differ in details of the configuration of the palate.

== Taxonomy ==
It was first recorded in 2002, when three individuals were captured in Madagascar's Anjozorobe forest. In 2005, the species was formally described by Steven Goodman and colleagues as Voalavo antsahabensis, the second species in the genus Voalavo. The only previously known species, the northern voalavo, occurs further to the north, in the Northern Highlands. The sequences of the cytochrome b gene differ by about 10% in these two species. The specific name, antsahabensis, derives from the name of the village of Antsahabe, which is near the place where the holotype was found. The common name "Eastern Voalavo" has been used for this species.

== Description ==
Species of Voalavo are small rodents with a delicate skull and without a tuft at the tip of the tail (as present in the closely related genus Eliurus). The eastern voalavo is similar to the northern voalavo and differs only in subtle characters. The tail is shorter in the eastern voalavo, but the head and body is slightly longer, as is the ear. However, the latter two apparent contrasts may be the result of differences in measurement technique. In both species, the final 25 to 30 mm (0.98 to 1.18 in) of the tail are covered with white hairs. In three specimens of eastern voalavo, head and body length ranges from 88 to 91 mm (3.5 to 3.6 in), tail length is 106 to 114 mm (4.2 to 4.5 in), hindfoot length 19 to 20 mm (0.75 to 0.79 in), ear length 15 to 16 mm (0.59 to 0.63 in), and body mass 20.7 to 22.6 g (0.73 to 0.80 oz).

In the skull, it has a significantly longer rostrum (the front part of the skull) and diastema (the gap between the incisors and the molars). Furthermore, it has shorter molar rows in both the upper and lower jaws. The back end of the incisive foramina (openings in the front part of the palate), which is located in front of the first molars, is rounded in eastern voalavo, but angular in northern voalavo. The sutures of the maxillary and palatine bones (the line where the two bones, part of the skull, join) are straight and parallel to each other, the toothrows, and the midline of the skull in eastern voalavo. Northern voalavo, in contrast, are more curved. Statistical analysis of measurements of the skull and teeth clearly separates the two species of Voalavo.

== Distribution and ecology ==
It is only known from the forests at Anjozorobe, on the eastern margin of Madagascar's Central Highlands. Among the specimens found in 2002, two were captured at 1,425 m (4,675 ft) altitude on a Uapaca densifolia branch, about 1.5 m (4.9 ft) over the ground, in moist montane forest, and a third was caught on the ground at 1,275 m (4,183 ft) altitude. This last specimen, a male, had its testicles located in the scrotum, and therefore was reproductively mature, even though its skull bones were not completely fused, indicating it was not yet osteologically mature. Before it was collected in 2002, the species was not recorded in earlier biological surveys of Anjozorobe, taking place in 1977–1986 and 1996; whether this is because the animal is difficult to collect, because its abundance varies from year to year, or because its distribution is patchy is unknown. Goodman and colleagues argued on the basis of this example that rapid surveys may not necessarily yield complete inventories of the fauna of an area. Later surveys in 2005 and 2006 did find it at several other sites in the region, at some of which it was abundant. Anjozorobe is about 450 km (280 mi) from the nearest occurrence of northern voalavo, and most of the intervening area contains montane forest. However, this forest zone is bisected by the low-lying Mandritsara Window, which may serve as a barrier between the two species of Voalavo.

== Conservation status ==
It is listed as "Endangered" on the IUCN Red List because of its small, vulnerable range; the Anjozorobe forest is threatened by the practice of slash-and-burn agriculture (tavy). However, its habitat has been designated as a protected area, the Couloir Forestier d'Anjozorobe-Angavo.

== Literature cited ==
- Goodman, S.M.; Rakotondravony, D.; Randriamanantsoa, H.N.; Rakotomalala-Razanahoera, M. (2005). "A new species of rodent from the montane forest of central eastern Madagascar (Muridae: Nesomyinae: Voalavo)". Proceedings of the Biological Society of Washington. 118 (4): 863–873. doi:10.2988/0006-324X(2005)118[863:ANSORF]2.0.CO;2. S2CID 85727603.
