= Karl Koopman =

American zoologist

- Born: 1 April 1920; Honolulu
- Died: 22 September 1997 (aged 77); New York City

Karl Koopman (1 April 1920 – 22 September 1997) was an American zoologist with a special interest in bats. He worked for many years in the Mammalogy Department of the American Museum of Natural History in New York.

== Eponyms ==
Mammal species named after him include Monticolomys koopmani, Rattus koopmani, and Sturnira koopmanhilli. There is also a subgenus of the bat genus Artibeus, named after him, Koopmania.

Also, a reptile species, Anolis koopmani, is named in his honor.
