= Northern Highlands =

Biogeographical region of Madagascar

Coordinates: 14.5°S 49.0°E

The Northern Highlands are a mountainous biogeographical region of northern Madagascar. The region includes the Tsaratanana Massif (with the highest mountain of Madagascar, Maromokotro) and smaller nearby massifs such as Marojejy, Anjanaharibe-Sud, and Manongarivo. The Mandritsara Window separates the Northern from the Central Highlands and apparently acts as a barrier to dispersal between the two highlands, leading to species pairs such as Voalavo gymnocaudus (Northern Highlands) and Voalavo antsahabensis (Central Highlands). None of the montane endemics of Tsaratanana are shared with the major massifs of the Central Highlands.

== Literature cited ==
- Goodman, S.M., Rakotondravony, D., Randriamanantsoa, H.N. and Rakotomalala-Razanahoera, M. 2005. A new species of rodent from the montane forest of central eastern Madagascar (Muridae: Nesomyinae: Voalavo). Proceedings of the Biological Society of Washington 118(4):863–873.
- Goodman, S.M., Raxworthy, C.J., Maminirina, C.P. and Olson, L.E. 2006. A new species of shrew tenrec (Microgale jobihely) from northern Madagascar. Journal of Zoology 270:384–398.
- Raxworthy, C.J. and Nussbaum, R.A. 1996. Montane amphibian and reptile communities in Madagascar (subscription required). Conservation Biology 10(3):750–756.
