= Paw =

Soft foot-like part of a mammal that has claws

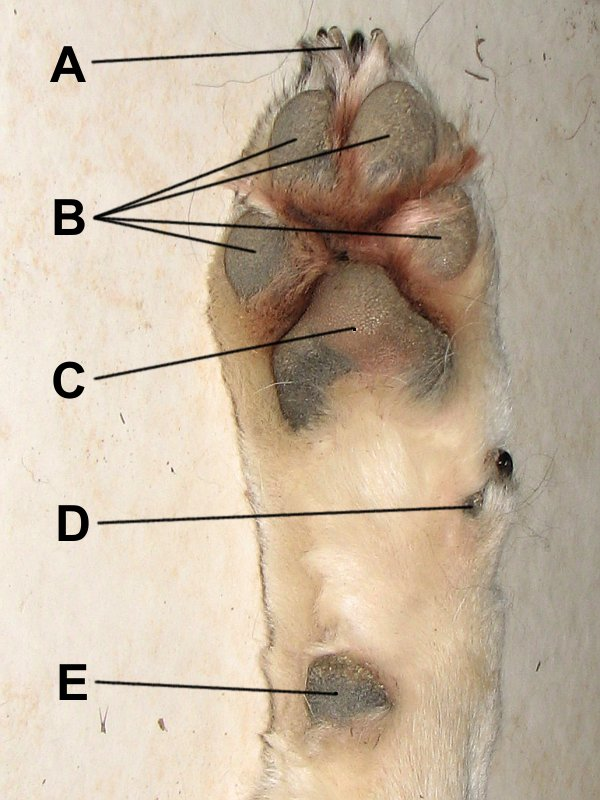
Right front paw of dog showing A) claw, B) digital pads, C) metacarpal pad, D) dewclaw, E) carpal pad.

A paw is the soft foot-like part of a mammal, generally a quadruped, that has claws. To paw is for an animal to use their paws, usually gently or for digging, or for a human to use their hands in the manner of an animal's paw.

== Common characteristics ==
The paw is characterised by thin, pigmented, keratinised, hairless epidermis covering subcutaneous collagenous and adipose tissue, which make up the pads. These pads act as a cushion for the load-bearing limbs of the animal. The paw consists of the large, heart-shaped metacarpal or palmar pad (forelimb) or metatarsal or plantar pad (rear limb), and generally four load-bearing digital pads, although there can be five or six toes in the case of domestic cats and bears (including giant panda). A carpal pad is also found on the forelimb which is used for additional traction when stopping or descending a slope in digitigrade species. Additional dewclaws can also be present.

The paw also includes a horn-like, beak shaped claw on each digit. Though usually hairless, certain animals do have fur on the soles of their paws. An example is the red panda, whose furry soles help insulate them in their snowy habitat.

== Animals with paws ==
- Felids, such as cats and tigers; some of these animals may have toe tufts
- Canids, such as dogs and foxes
- Rabbits and other lagomorphs have paws with very sharp nails and have no pads underneath them
- Bears and raccoons
- Weasels and other mustelids
- Rodents

== Gallery ==
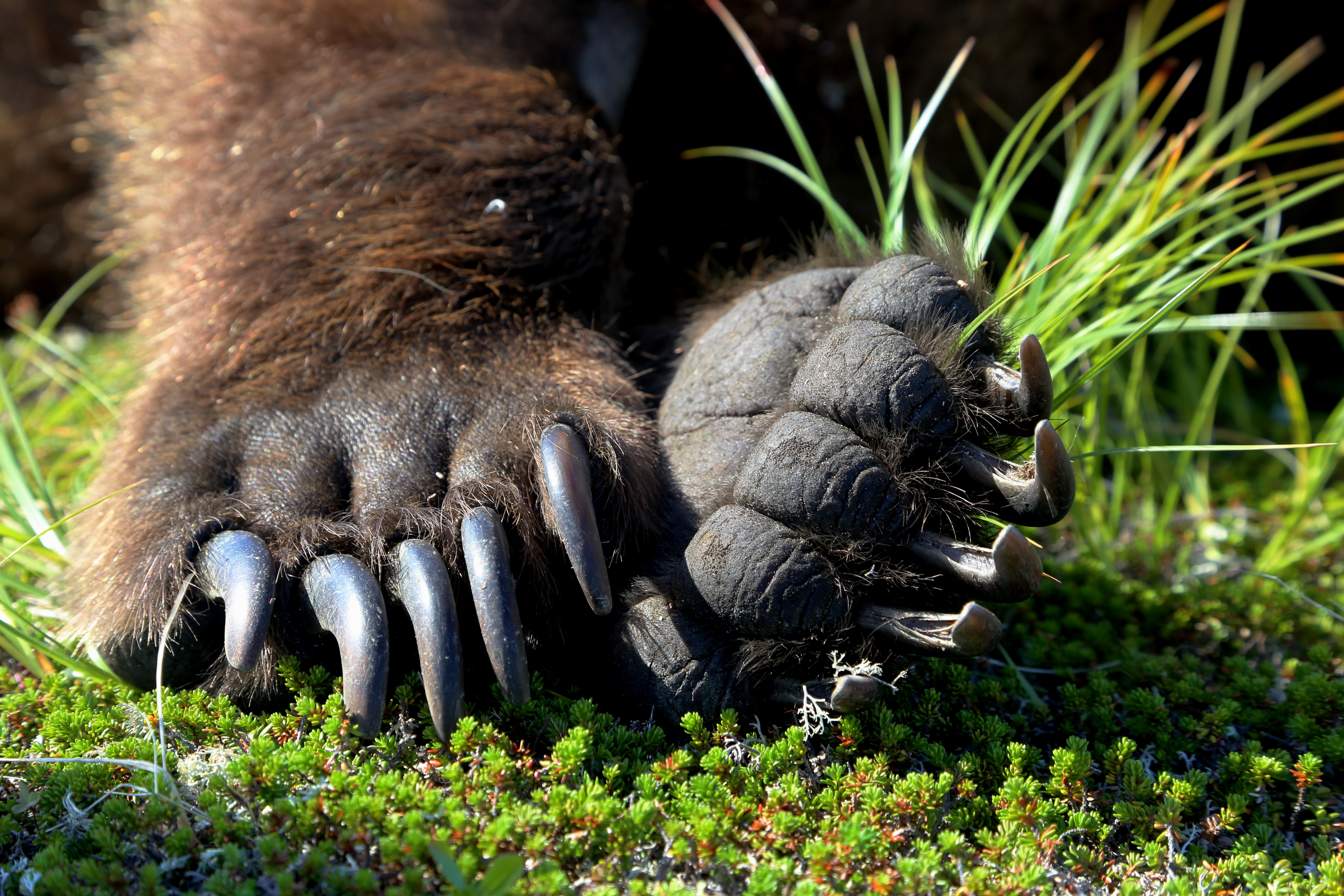
An American brown bear's paws.

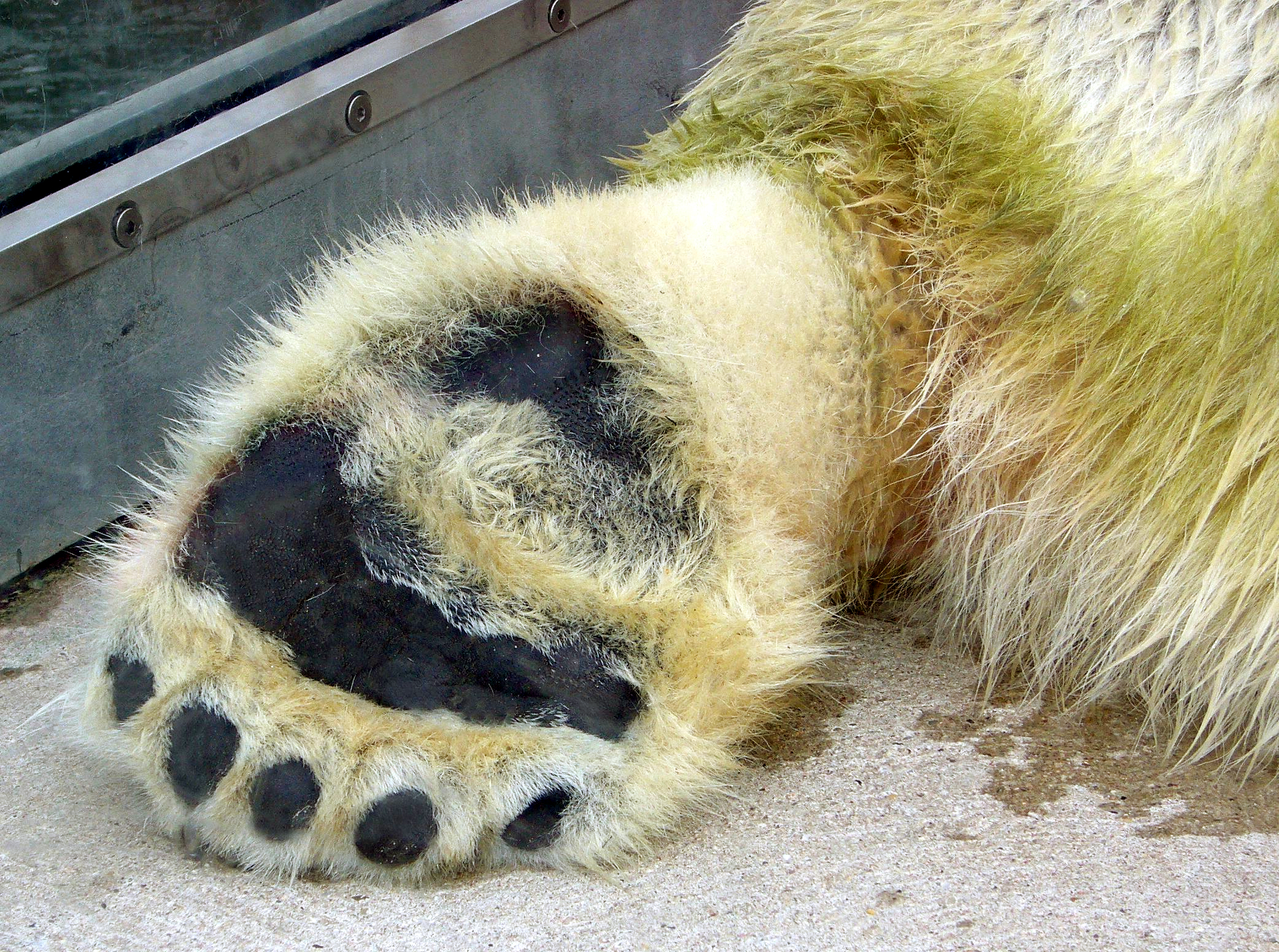
A polar bear's paws.

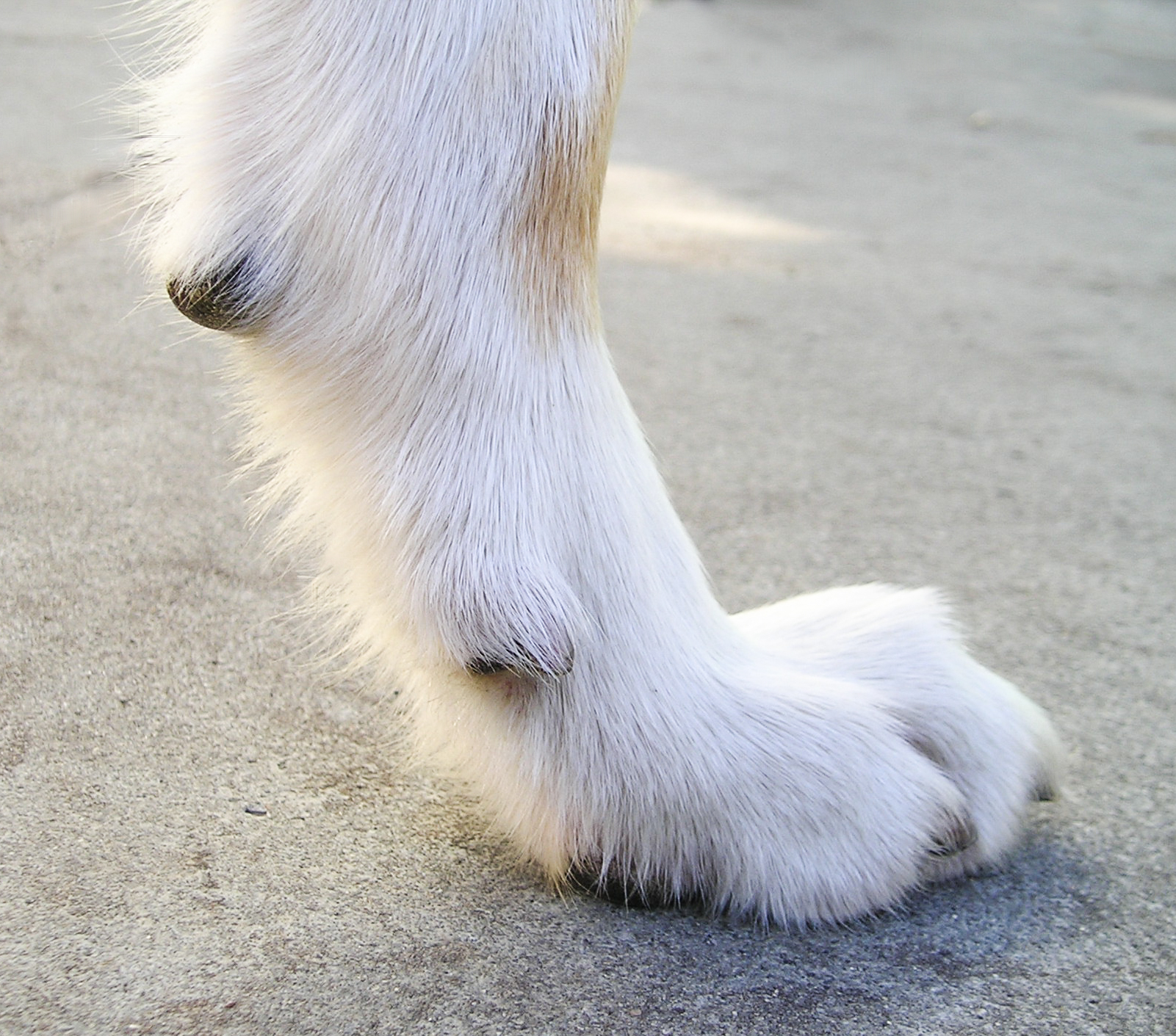
A dog's paw resting on a hard concrete surface

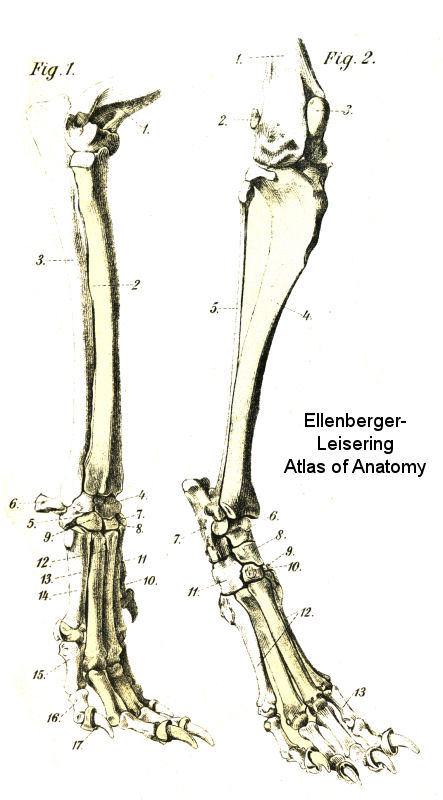
Structures of the leg and paw of a dog.

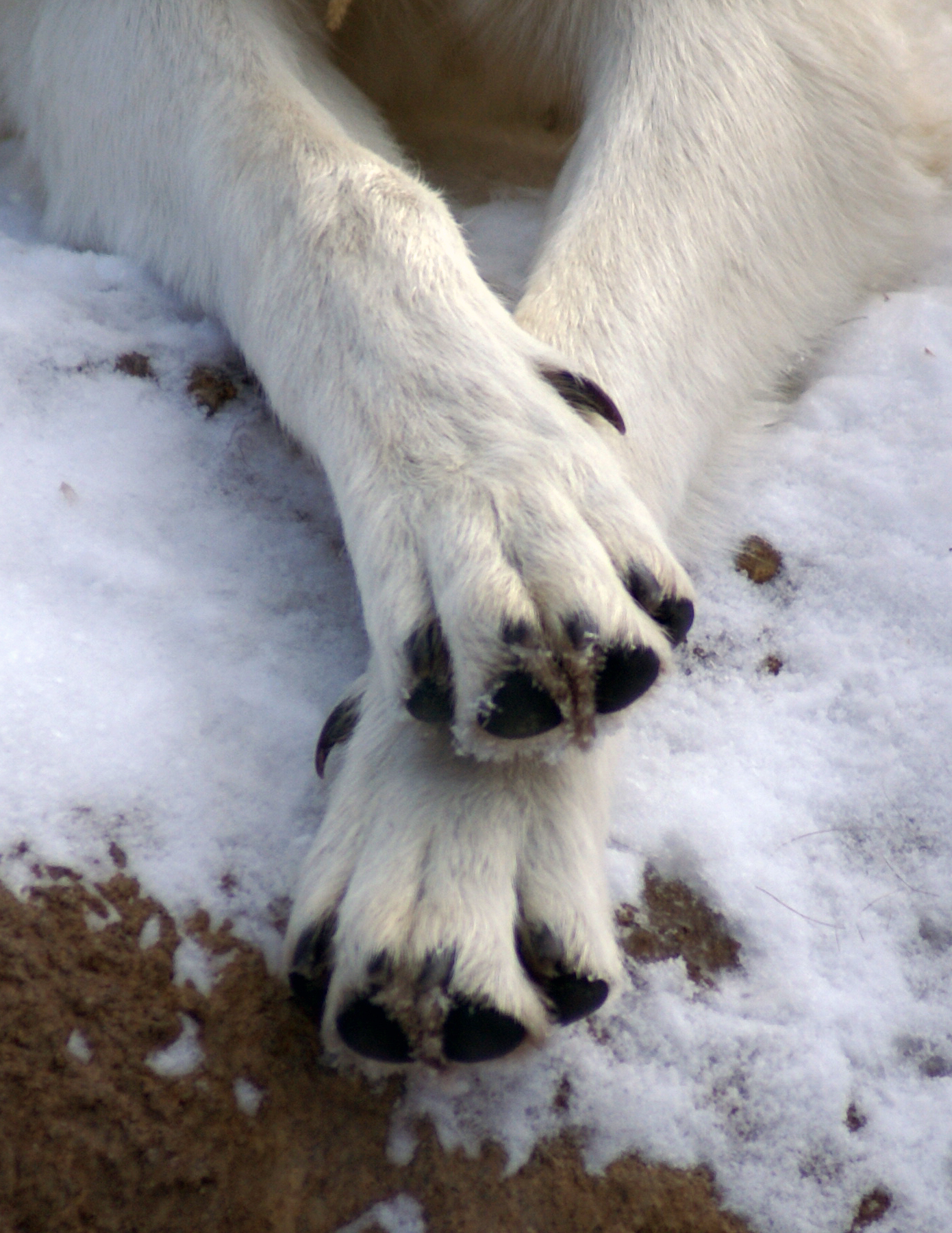
A wolf's paws

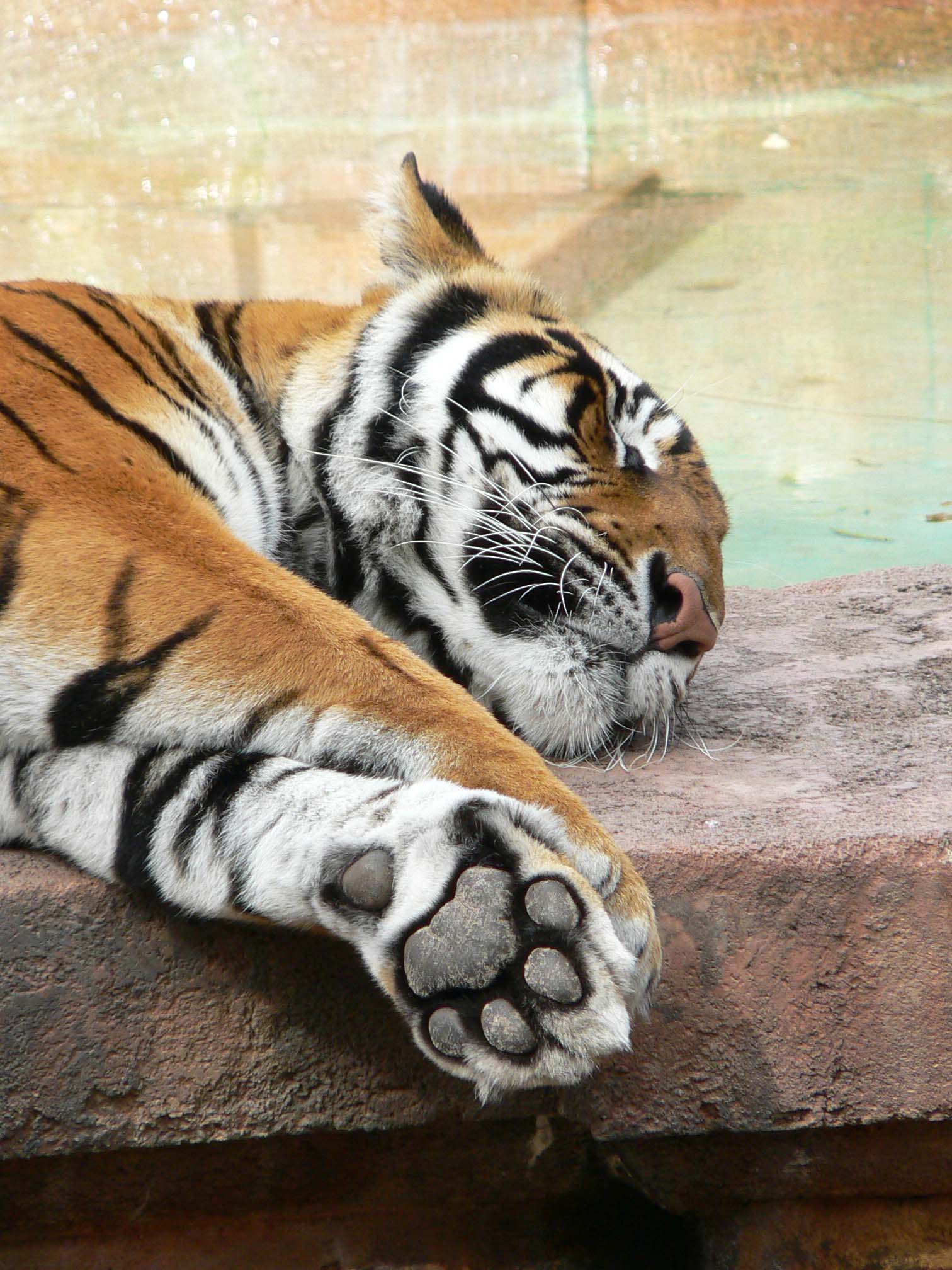
A tiger's paw, showing pads

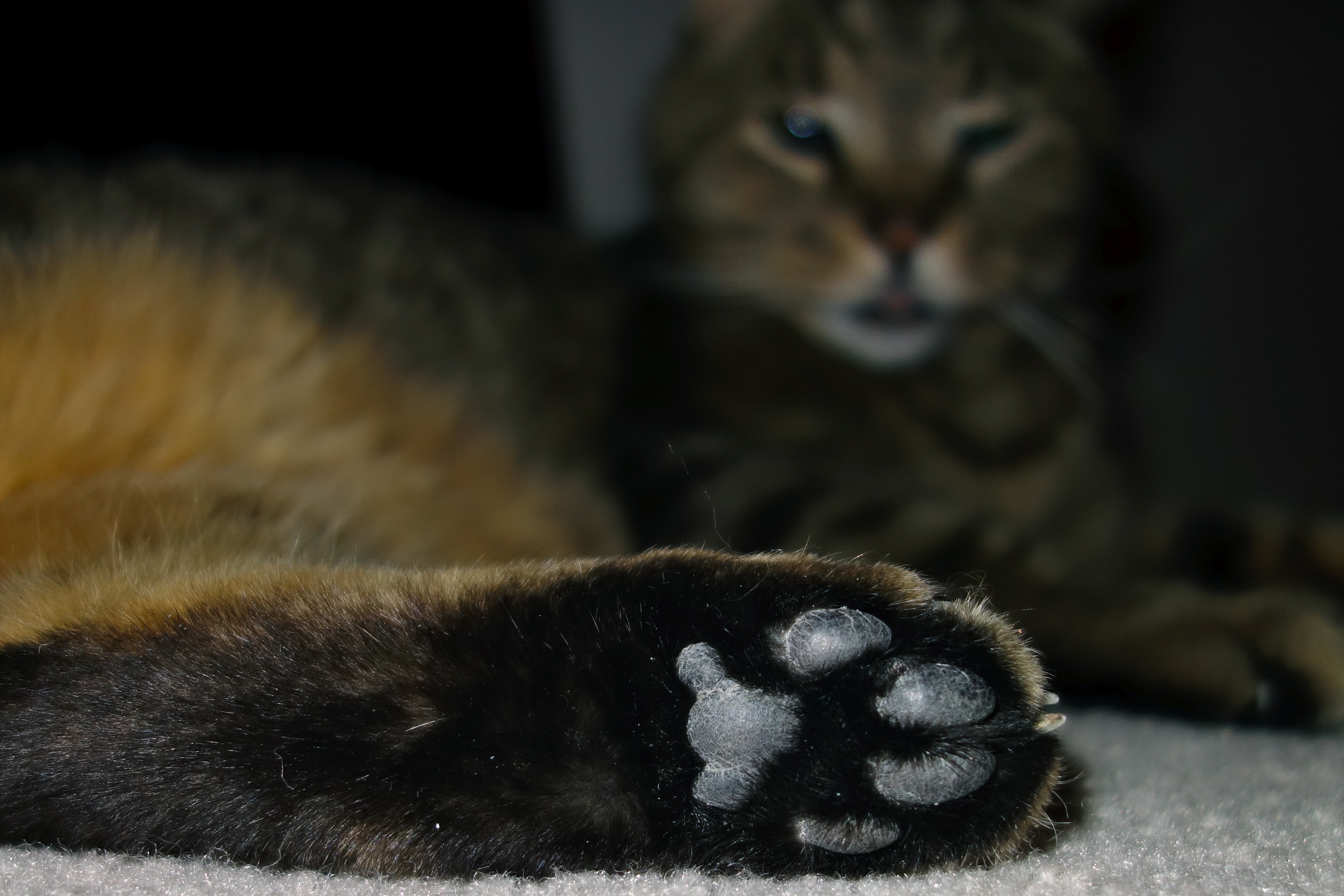
A cat's paw, showing pads.

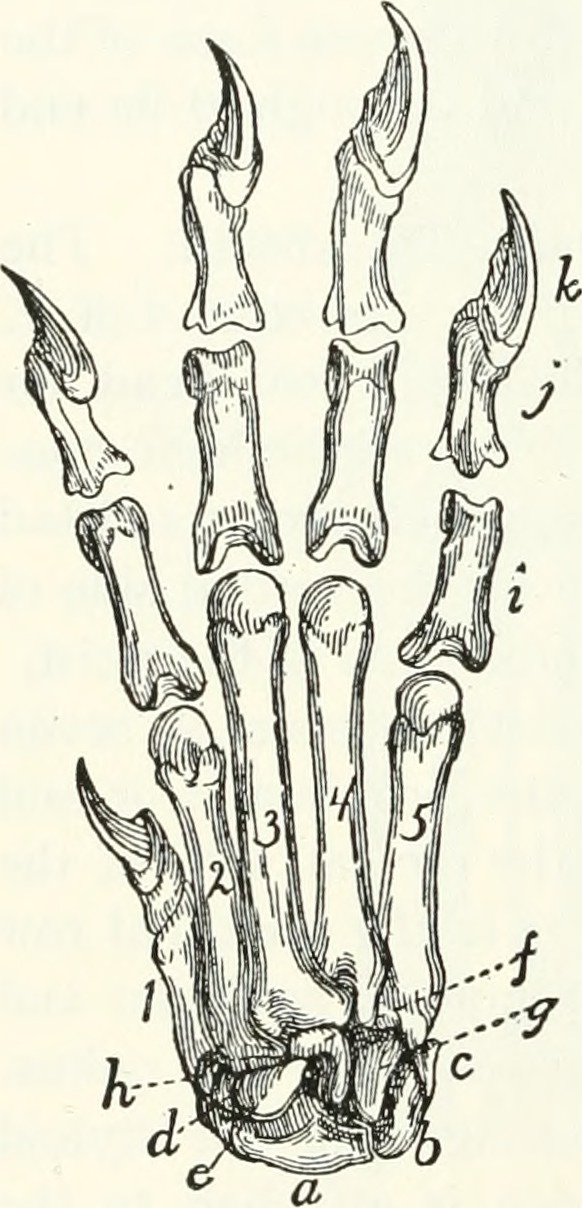
Structures of the paw of a cat.

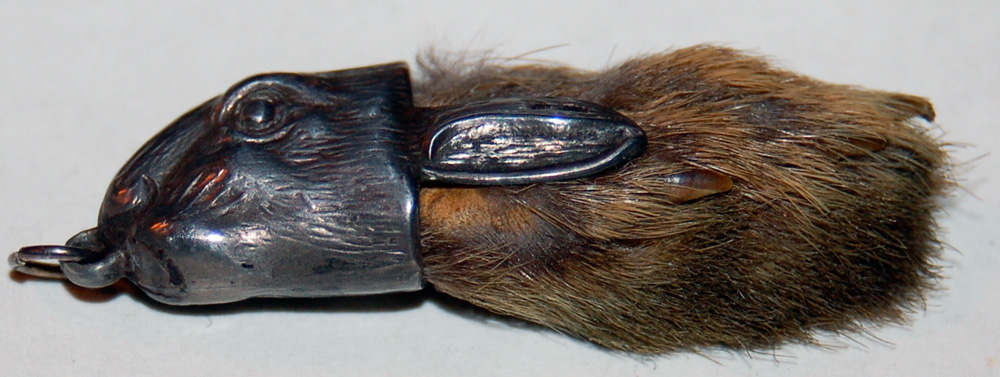
A rabbit's foot.

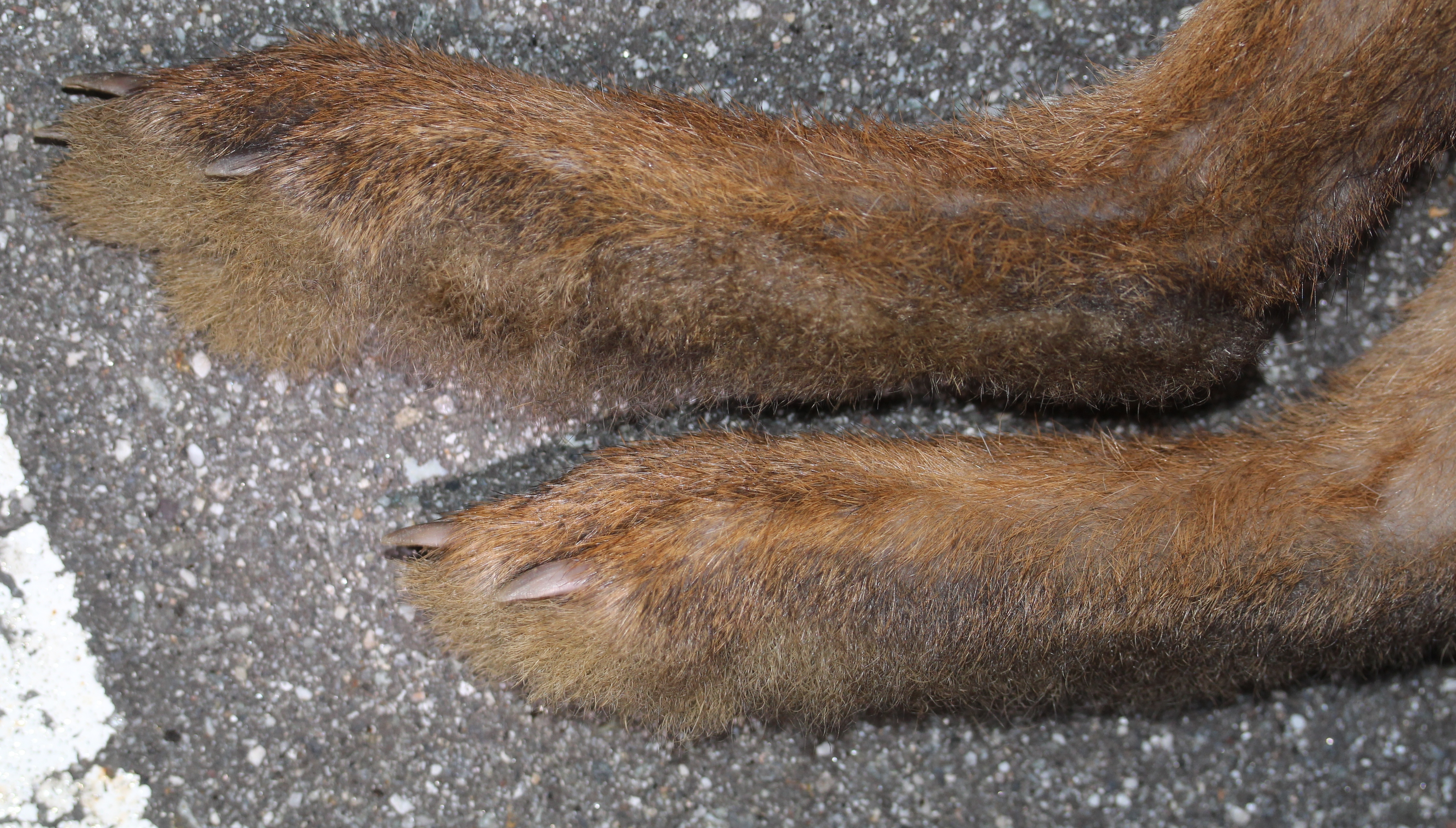
The hind paws of a Japanese hare.

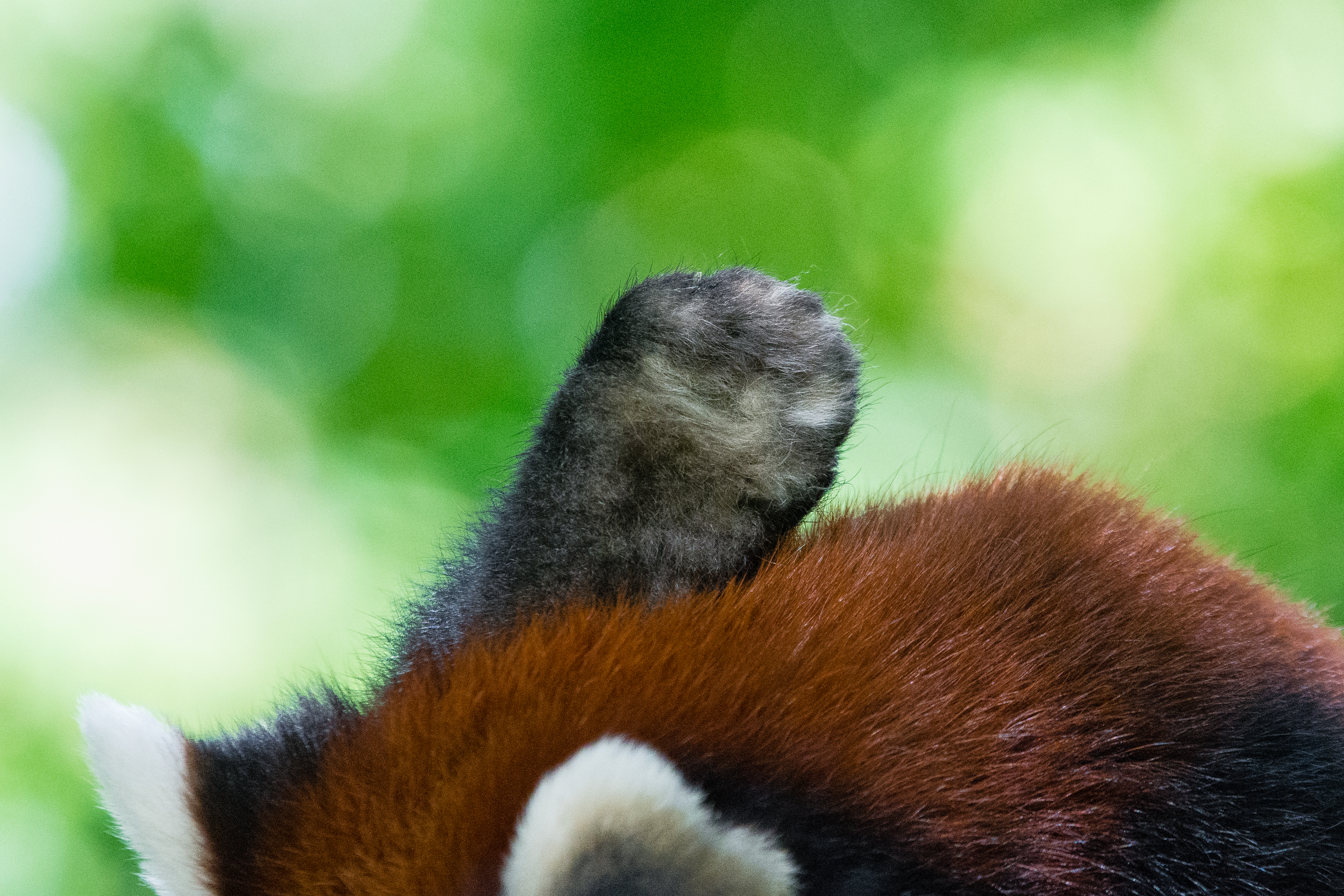
A red panda's paw, showing the absence of paw pads.

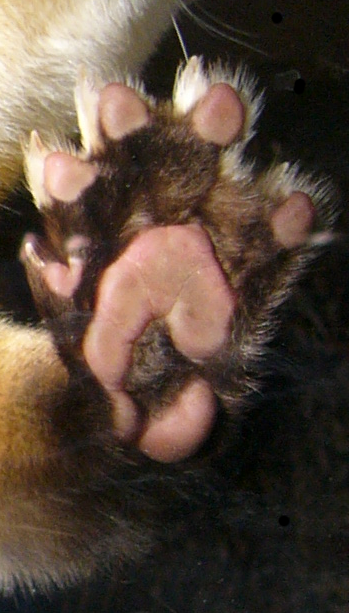
The paw of a yellow-throated marten.

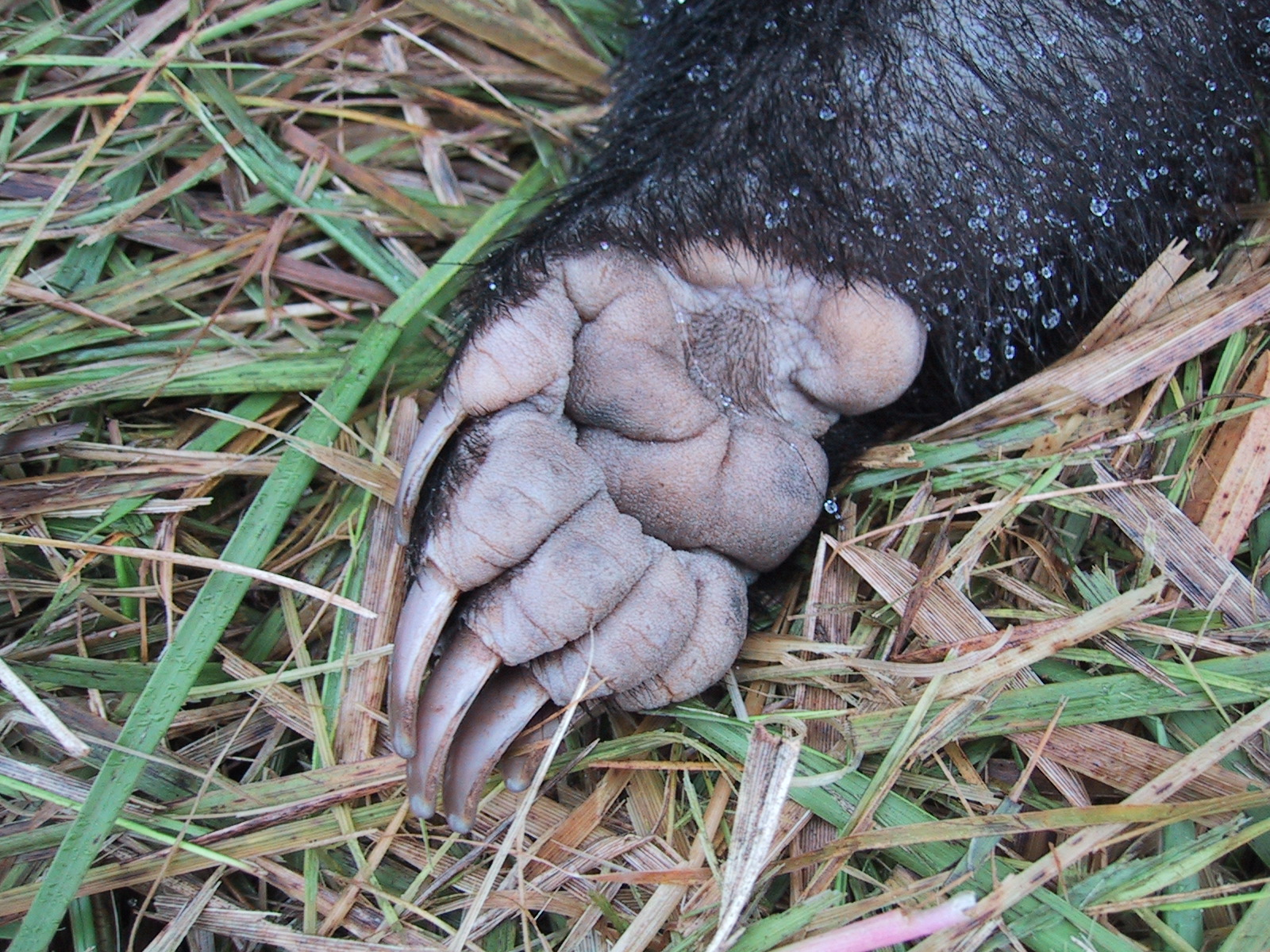
The forepaw of a European badger.

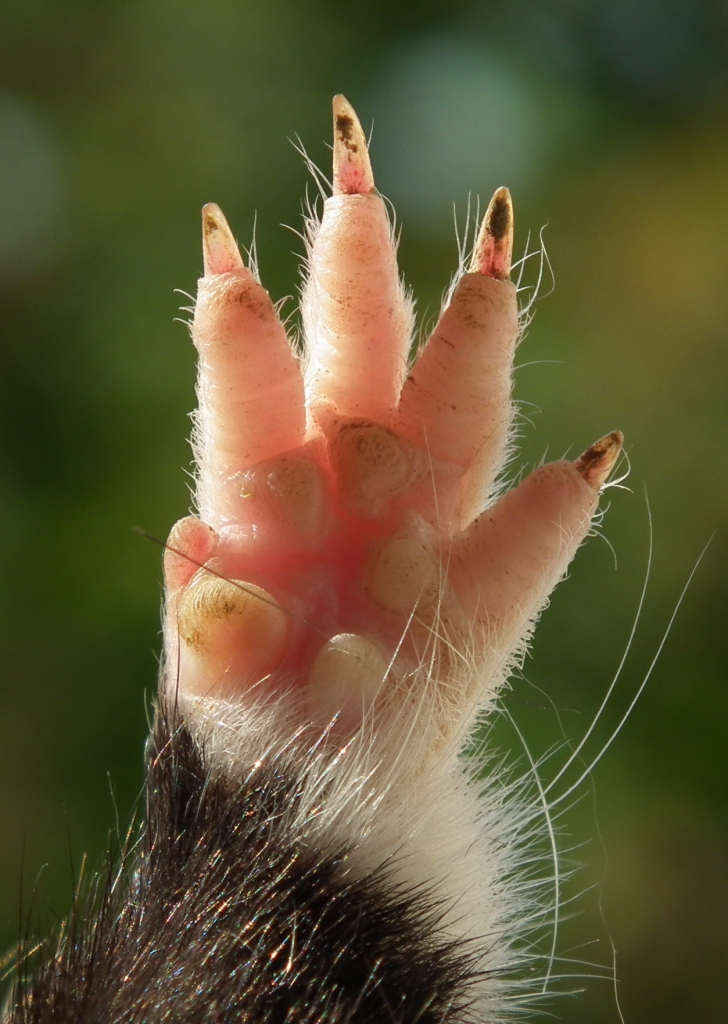
Front paw of European hamster

== See also ==
- Claw
- Digitigrade
- Hupao Spring, named for a legend concerning tigers pawing it into existence

== Bibliography ==
- Maine Coon Polydactyl International
