= Atopomelidae =

Scientific classification
- Kingdom: Animalia
- Phylum: Arthropoda
- Subphylum: Chelicerata
- Class: Arachnida
- Order: Sarcoptiformes
- Family: Atopomelidae

Family of mites

Atopomelidae is a family of mites belonging to the order Sarcoptiformes. Parasites have been investigated for some New World primates; however, very little is known about ectoparasites and specifically fur mites. In this study, Alouatta palliata, Cebus capucinus, Saimiri oerstedii, and Ateles geoffroyi monkeys from different areas of Costa Rica were searched for fur mites. A total of 276 monkeys were evaluated, and 51 of them were positive for mites of the family Atopomelidae. Listrocarpus alouattae was identified on 22.3% of A. palliata; Listrocarpus capucinus on 12.8% of C. capucinus; and Listrocarpus costaricensis on 36.8% of S. oerstedii; No fur mites were found on A. geoffroyi. Sex was not considered a determinant of mite infestation, but prevalence was significantly higher in the Central Volcanic Mountain Range Conservation Area for L. alouattae (p=0.01) and in the Central Pacific Conservation Area for L. capucinus (p=0.002). These primate fur mites are highly host-specific. Differences in the geographical distribution may be due to monkey behavior and history, as well as to environmental conditions.

== Genera ==
Genera:

- Atellana Domrow, 1958
- Atopomelus Trouessart, 1918
- Austrobius Fain, 1971
- Austrochirus Womersley, 1943
