= Anjanaharibe-Sud Special Reserve =

- IUCN category IV (habitat/species management area)
- Location within Madagascar
- Location: North-east Madagascar
- Nearest city: Andapa
- Coordinates: 14°42′S 49°26′E
- Area: 374.82 km^{2} (144.72 sq mi)
- Established: 1958
- Governing body: Madagascar National Parks Association (PNM-ANGAP)

Anjanaharibe-Sud Special Reserve is a wildlife reserve in the north-east of Madagascar. The reserve was designated in 1958 and contains some of the last intact primary rainforest, along with several, rare and endemic animals and plants. The area was nominated to the UNESCO Tentative List of World Heritage Sites in Madagascar in 2008, as an extension of the rainforests of the Atsinanana.

== Geography ==
The special reserve of Anjanahraibe-Sud is located in the Sava Region in north-eastern Madagascar, some 25 kilometres (16 mi) south-west of the village of Andapa. It has an area of 32,090 ha (79,296 acres) and the main part of the reserve is between 500–1,500 metres (1,600–4,900 ft), with peaks up to 2,064 metres (6,772 ft). There is, on average, over 3,000 millimetres (120 in) of rain each year and there is little difference in temperatures between the warm season of November to April, 27 °C (81 °F), and the cool season of May to October 22 °C (72 °F). Two rivers cross the Anjanaharibe-Sud Reserve: the Fotsialanana River and the Marolakana River, which flow into the river of Ankaibe.

The park headquarters is located in Andapa. Access is difficult and the best way to visit is by 4x4.

== Flora and fauna ==
The changes in altitude gives variation in the types of forest, with humid forest at 600–1,200 metres (2,000–3,900 ft), sclerophyllous mountain forest up to 1,400 metres (4,600 ft) and montane forest on the highest slopes up to 1,600 metres (5,200 ft). One of the rarest species is a small tree with aromatic leaves, Takhtajania perrieri, which is classified as an endangered species by the International Union for Conservation of Nature (IUCN). The first specimen was found in 1909, 150 kilometres (93 mi) away, and in 1997 a population of 250 trees was found on the Anjanaharibe-Sud Reserve. The tree is estimated to have evolved 120 million years ago.

There are twelve species of lemurs in the reserve, 120 species of birds, 55 species of amphibians and forty species of reptiles.

== See also ==
- Marojejy National Park
- Sava Region
