= Oryzorictinae =

Scientific classification
- Kingdom: Animalia
- Phylum: Chordata
- Class: Mammalia
- Order: Afrosoricida
- Suborder: Tenrecomorpha
- Family: Tenrecidae
- Subfamily: Oryzorictinae; Dobson, 1882
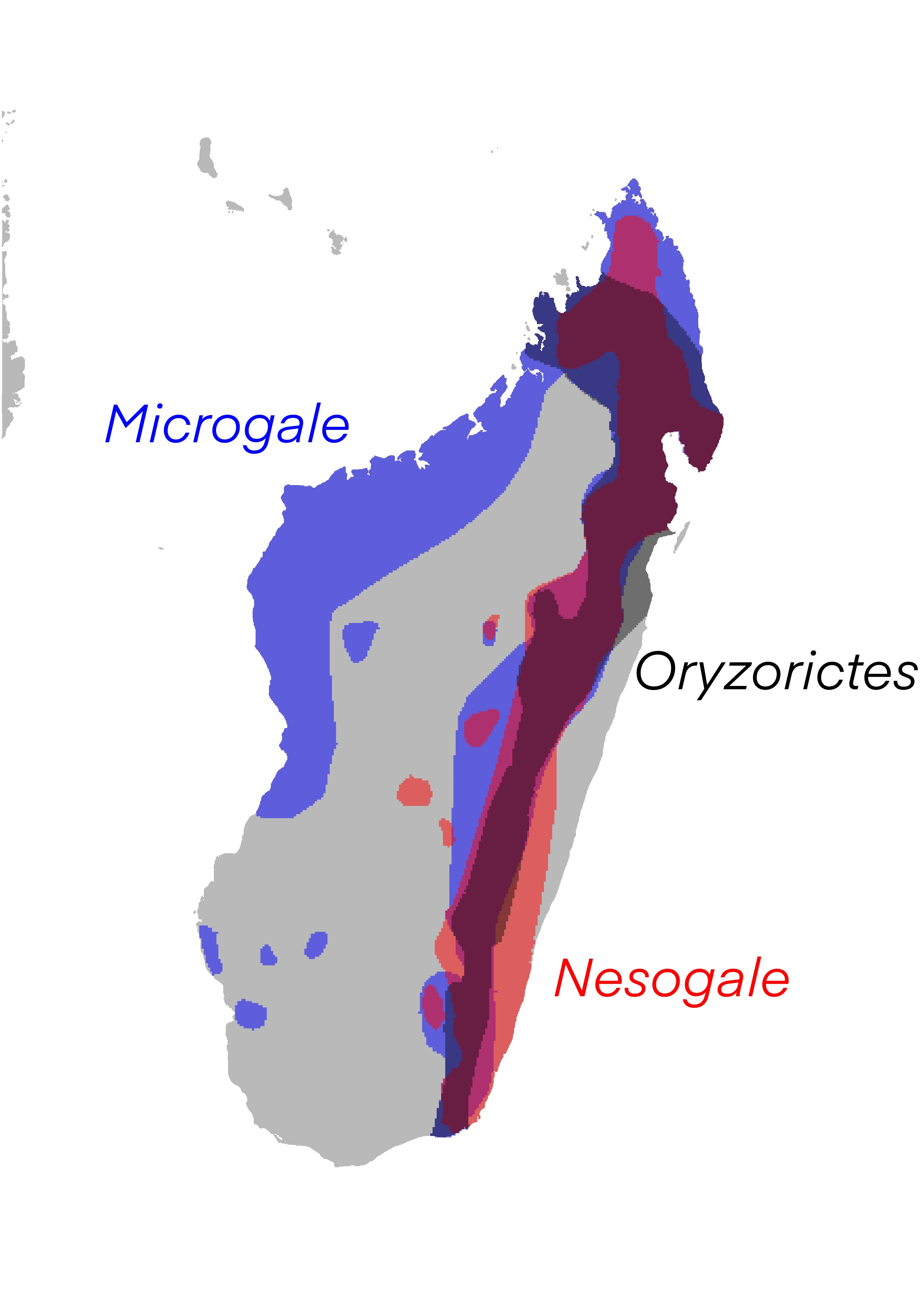

Subfamily of mammals

Oryzorictinae is a subfamily of tenrecs endemic to the island of Madagascar. It is the largest of three tenrec subfamilies. Oryzorictinae is thought to have split from the lineage of its closest relative, Geogale, about 30 million years (Ma) ago. The deepest phylogenetic split within the subfamily, that between Oryzorictes and a clade composed of Microgale plus Nesogale, is thought to have occurred about 28 Ma ago. In turn, Microgale and Nesogale are thought to have diverged about 19 Ma ago.

== Species ==
Subfamily Oryzorictinae

- Genus Microgale
  - Short-tailed shrew tenrec (M. brevicaudata)
  - Cowan's shrew tenrec (M. cowani)
  - Drouhard's shrew tenrec (M. drouhardi)
  - Dryad shrew tenrec (M. dryas)
  - Pale shrew tenrec (M. fotsifotsy)
  - Gracile shrew tenrec (M. gracilis)
  - Grandidier's shrew tenrec (M. grandidieri)
  - Naked-nosed shrew tenrec (M. gymnorhyncha)
  - Jenkins's shrew tenrec (M. jenkinsae)
  - Northern shrew tenrec (M. jobihely)
  - Lesser long-tailed shrew tenrec (M. longicaudata)
  - Microgale macpheei (extinct)
  - Major's long-tailed tenrec (M. majori)
  - Web-footed tenrec (M. mergulus)
  - Montane shrew tenrec (M. monticola)
  - Nasolo's shrew tenrec (M. nasoloi)
  - Pygmy shrew tenrec (M. parvula)
  - Greater long-tailed shrew tenrec (M. principula)
  - Least shrew tenrec (M. pusilla)
  - Shrew-toothed shrew tenrec (M. soricoides)
  - Taiva shrew tenrec (M. taiva)
  - Thomas's shrew tenrec (M. thomasi)
- Genus Nesogale
  - Dobson's shrew tenrec (N. dobsoni)
  - Talazac's shrew tenrec (N. talazaci)
- Genus Oryzorictes
  - Mole-like rice tenrec (O. hova)
  - Four-toed rice tenrec (O. tetradactylus)

== See also ==
- Convergent evolution
- List of mammals of Madagascar
