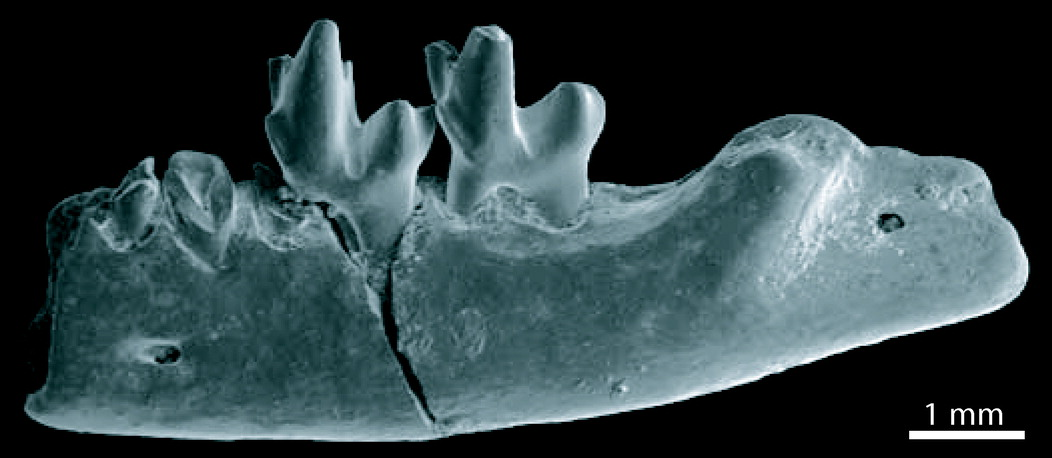
- Molars and lower jaw fragment

Scientific classification
- Kingdom: Animalia
- Phylum: Chordata
- Class: Mammalia
- Order: Afrosoricida
- Genus: †Dilambdogale; Erik R. Seiffert, 2010

Species
- D. gheerbranti Erik R. Seiffert, 2010 (type)

= Dilambdogale =

Dilambdogale Temporal range: 37.2 Ma Late Eocene

Dilambdogale is an extinct genus of afrosoricid which existed in Fayum, Egypt during the latest Eocene (earliest Priabonian age). It was first named by Erik R. Seiffert in 2010 and the type species is Dilambdogale gheerbranti. Dilambdogale is the oldest known afrosoricid and its closest relative was Widanelfarasia.

Cladogram based on Seiffert (2010):

- Afrosoricida
  - Todralestes
  - - - Afrodon
      - - Dilambdogale
        - Widanelfarasia
    - - Protenrec
      - - Chrysochloroidea
          - Amblysomus
          - Chrysochloris
        - Tenrecoidea
          - Potamogale
          - - Microgale
            - - - Echinops
                - Setifer
              - - Hemicentetes
                - Tenrec
