= Web-footed tenrec =

Conservation status
- Vulnerable (IUCN 3.1)

Scientific classification
- Kingdom: Animalia
- Phylum: Chordata
- Class: Mammalia
- Order: Afrosoricida
- Suborder: Tenrecomorpha
- Family: Tenrecidae
- Genus: Microgale
- Species: M. mergulus

Binomial name
- Microgale mergulus (Forsyth Major, 1896)
- Web-footed tenrec range

Synonyms
- Limnogale mergulus Major, 1896

Species of mammal

The web-footed tenrec, Malagasy otter shrew, or aquatic tenrec (Microgale mergulus) is the only known semiaquatic tenrec (the related African otter shrews have similar habits), and is found in eastern Madagascar, especially in and around Ranomafana National Park. It grows to between 25 and 39 cm (9.8 and 15.4 in), and was once thought to be extinct. It feeds on crabs, aquatic insects, and crayfish. The population is considered vulnerable. It was formerly placed in the monotypic genus Limnogale, but has been moved to Microgale based on molecular data showing it to be deeply nested within the latter.

== Life history ==
Microgale mergulus is strictly nocturnal, spending the day in stream side burrows, only emerging at night to hunt. Nocturnal movements appear to be restricted to waterways but include movements away from burrows and diving. Radio collar tracking has shown that some individuals are known to utilize stream channels as much as 1160 meters in length, while others may only patrol 500 meters. In one night a web-footed tenrec may travel 1550 meters along channels in search of food.

== Diet ==
M. mergulus is only known to inhabit stream habitats in eastern Madagascar. While it is no longer classified in the obsolete order of Insectivora, M. mergulus could very well be designated an insectivore. The bulk of its diet consists of aquatic insects and larvae, with crustaceans (crayfish), small fish, and tadpoles making up the rest. The larvae of insects in the orders Ephemeroptera, Odonata and Trichoptera are favored. Diets of individuals inhabiting zero-canopy steams appear to be the same as those living in forested streams.

== Phylogeny ==
The aquatic or web-footed tenrec, Microgale mergulus, and other tenrecs are endemic to Madagascar. They are part of the monophyletic clade Afrotheria, which includes placental mammals of diverse anatomies including hyraxes, elephants and mammoths, manatees and dugong, tenrecs, golden moles, elephant shrews, and aardvarks. Genetic sequencing and other methods have confirmed the accuracy and relatedness of this grouping.

The web-footed tenrec is one of 22 members of the genus Microgale. Molecular studies have led to its placement in the subfamily Oryzorictinae, along with two species each of the genera Nesogale and Oryzorictes. It is the largest member of this subfamily and likely evolved this increased size in response to its aquatic lifestyle. Ancestral tenrecs are thought to have rafted from mainland Africa to Madagascar in a single event. All tenrecs are thought to descend from a common ancestor that lived 29–37 million years (Ma) ago They include members of subfamilies Tenrecinae and Geogalinae as well as Oryzorictinae.

While it is similar in habits to the related equatorial African otter shrews of family Potamogalidae, their aquatic lifestyles evolved independently from one another. The split between tenrecs and otter shrews has been dated to about 47–53 Ma ago.

== Conservation ==
The aquatic tenrec is currently ranked by the IUCN as Vulnerable on the Red List. Due to their specialized habitat requirements and restriction to the island of Madagascar, it is estimated that less than 2,000 km^{2} of suitable habitat remains. Degradation of riparian ecosystems and siltation of streams are the leading threat to the species'. Deforestation is also recognized as a potential cause of decline. However, recent studies have shown healthy populations of M. mergulus in streams where forest has been cleared or otherwise degraded, as well as non-native plantations. Areas of its habitat which are currently protected include Ranomafana National Park and the Andringitra National Park (1989) and it is also reported in the new Nosy Volo Reserve in the east (2014).

Within afrotherian mammals, Microgale mergulus is typically considered for highest priority conservation priority along with the giant otter shrew, giant golden mole, northern shrew tenrec and Nimba otter shrew, as well as some better-known conservation symbols like the dugong, Asian elephant, and three species of manatees. This priority has been analyzed using two different methods, including phylogenetic diversity (PD) and evolutionary distinctiveness (ED).
