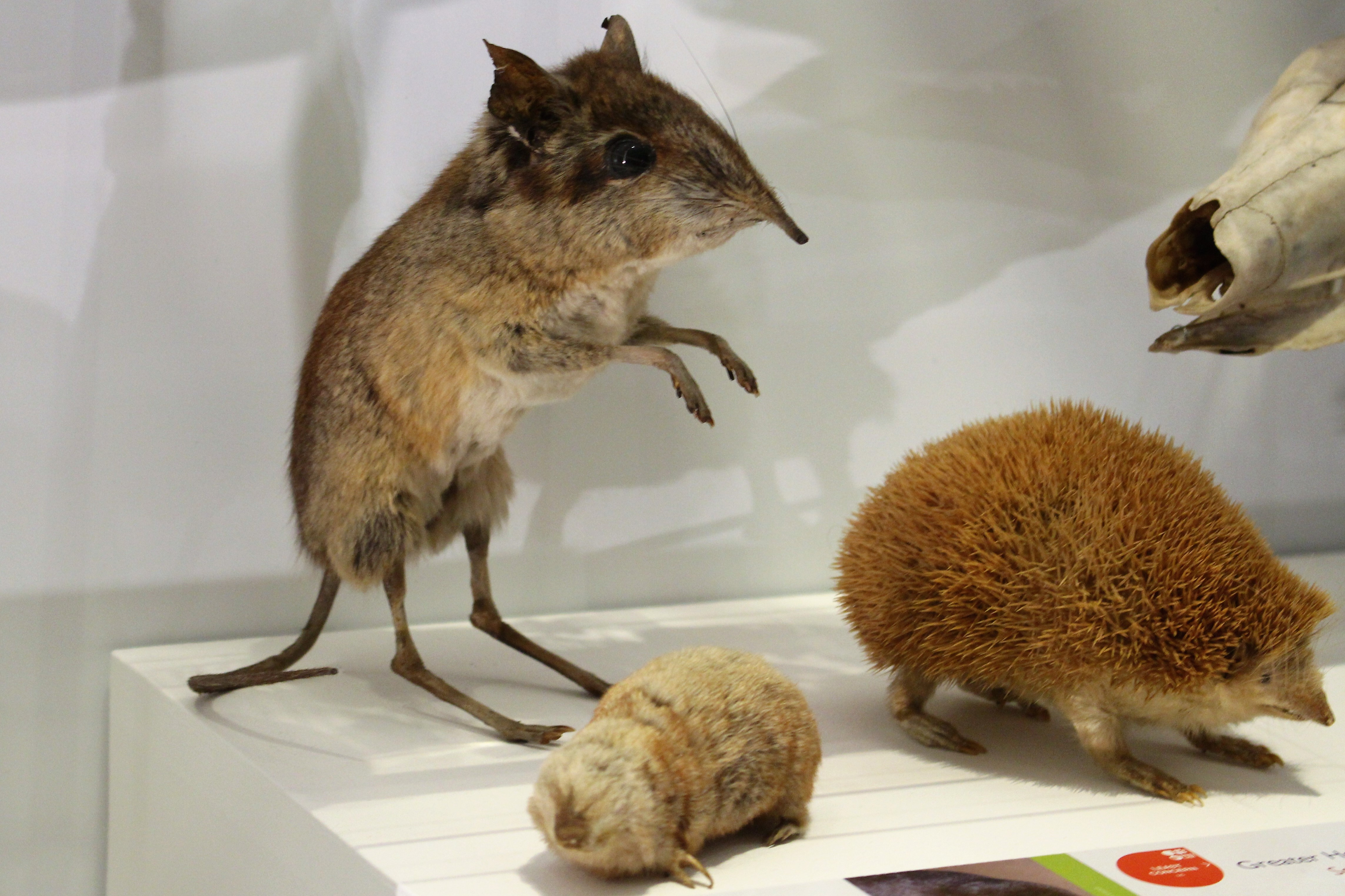
- Taxidermied animals at the Cambridge University Museum of Zoology, England. On the left four-toed elephant shrew (Petrodromus tetradactylus), in the middle Cape golden mole (Chrysochloris asiatica) and on the right greater hedgehog tenrec (Setifer setosus).

Scientific classification
- Kingdom: Animalia
- Phylum: Chordata
- Class: Mammalia
- Superorder: Afrotheria
- Grandorder: Afroinsectiphilia

Orders
- Tubulidentata; †Ptolemaiida; Afroinsectivora; Afrosoricida; Macroscelidea
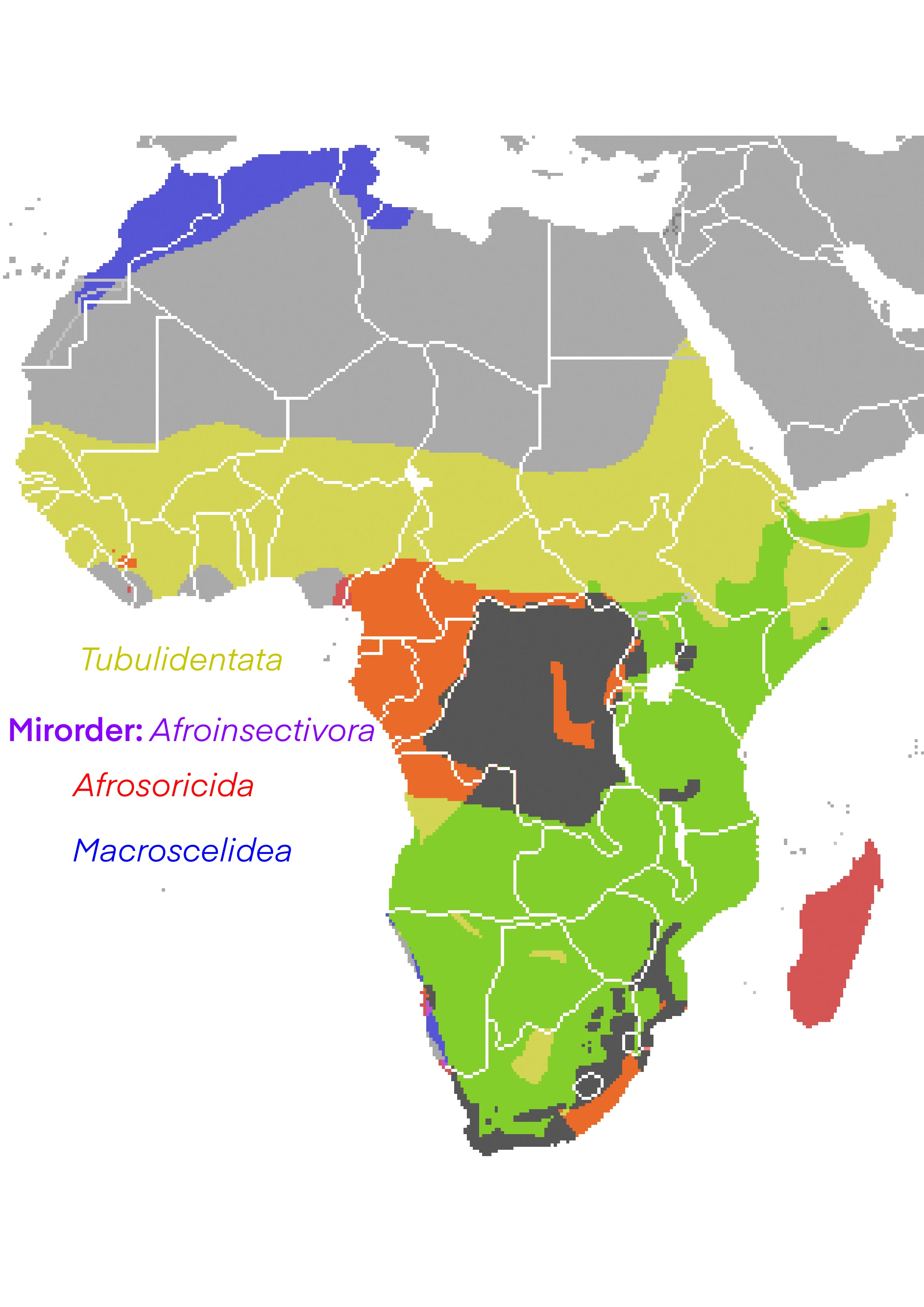
- Red: Afrosoricida, yellow: Tubulidentata, blue: Macroscelidea, orange: both Macroscelidea and Afrosoricida, green: both Macroscelidea and Tubulidentata, purple: both Macroscelidea and Afrosoricida, black: Tubulidentata, Afrosoricida and Macroscelidea

= Afroinsectiphilia =

Afroinsectiphilia Temporal range: Late Paleocene - Recent

Clade of mammals

Afroinsectiphilia (African insectivores) is a clade of afrotherian mammals that includes the golden moles, otter shrews, tenrecs, elephant shrews and aardvarks.

Afroinsectiphilia was first identified based on the results of molecular phylogenetic studies. Many of the taxa within it were once regarded as part of the order Insectivora, but Insectivora is now considered to be polyphyletic and obsolete.

Additionally, there might be some dental synapomorphies uniting afroinsectiphilians: p4 talonid and trigonid of similar breadth, a prominent p4 hypoconid, presence of a P4 metacone and absence of parastyles on M1–2. Additional features uniting ptolemaiidans and tubulidentates specifically include hypsodont molars that wear down to a flat surface; a long and shallow mandible with an elongated symphyseal region; and trigonids and talonids that are separated by lateral constrictions.

The sister group of Afroinsectiphilia is Paenungulata, the group containing hyraxes, sirenians and elephants, which were traditionally regarded as ungulates.

== Taxonomy ==
- Grandorder Afroinsectiphilia
  - Order Tubulidentata: aardvark
  - †Order Ptolemaiida: extinct carnivorous mammals, probably closely related to aardvarks.
  - Afroinsectivora
    - Order Macroscelidea: elephant shrews
    - Order Afrosoricida
      - Suborder Tenrecomorpha
        - Family Potamogalidae: otter shrews; 3 species in 2 genera
        - Family Tenrecidae: tenrecs; 31 extant species in 8 genera
        - †Incertae familiae: Genus Plesiorycteropus; extinct aardvark-like tenrec relatives from the Late Pleistocene/Holocene of Madagascar
      - Suborder Chrysochloridea
        - Family Chrysochloridae: golden moles; about 21 species in 9 genera

== Phylogeny ==
- Afrotheria
  - Paenungulata
    - Hyracoidea
      Procaviidae
    - Tethytheria
      - Sirenia
        - Trichechidae
        - Dugongidae
      - Proboscidea
        Elephantidae
  - Afroinsectiphilia
    - Tubulidentata
      Orycteropodidae
    - Afroinsectivora
      - Macroscelidea
        Macroscelididae
      - Afrosoricida
        - Chrysochloridae
        - Tenrecomorpha
          - Potamogalidae
          - Tenrecidae

A cladogram of Afrotheria based on molecular evidence
