= Microgale =

Scientific classification
- Kingdom: Animalia
- Phylum: Chordata
- Class: Mammalia
- Order: Afrosoricida
- Suborder: Tenrecomorpha
- Family: Tenrecidae
- Subfamily: Oryzorictinae
- Genus: Microgale; Thomas, 1882

Type species
- Microgale cowani Thomas, 1882

Species
- 21 extant, 1 extinct; see text
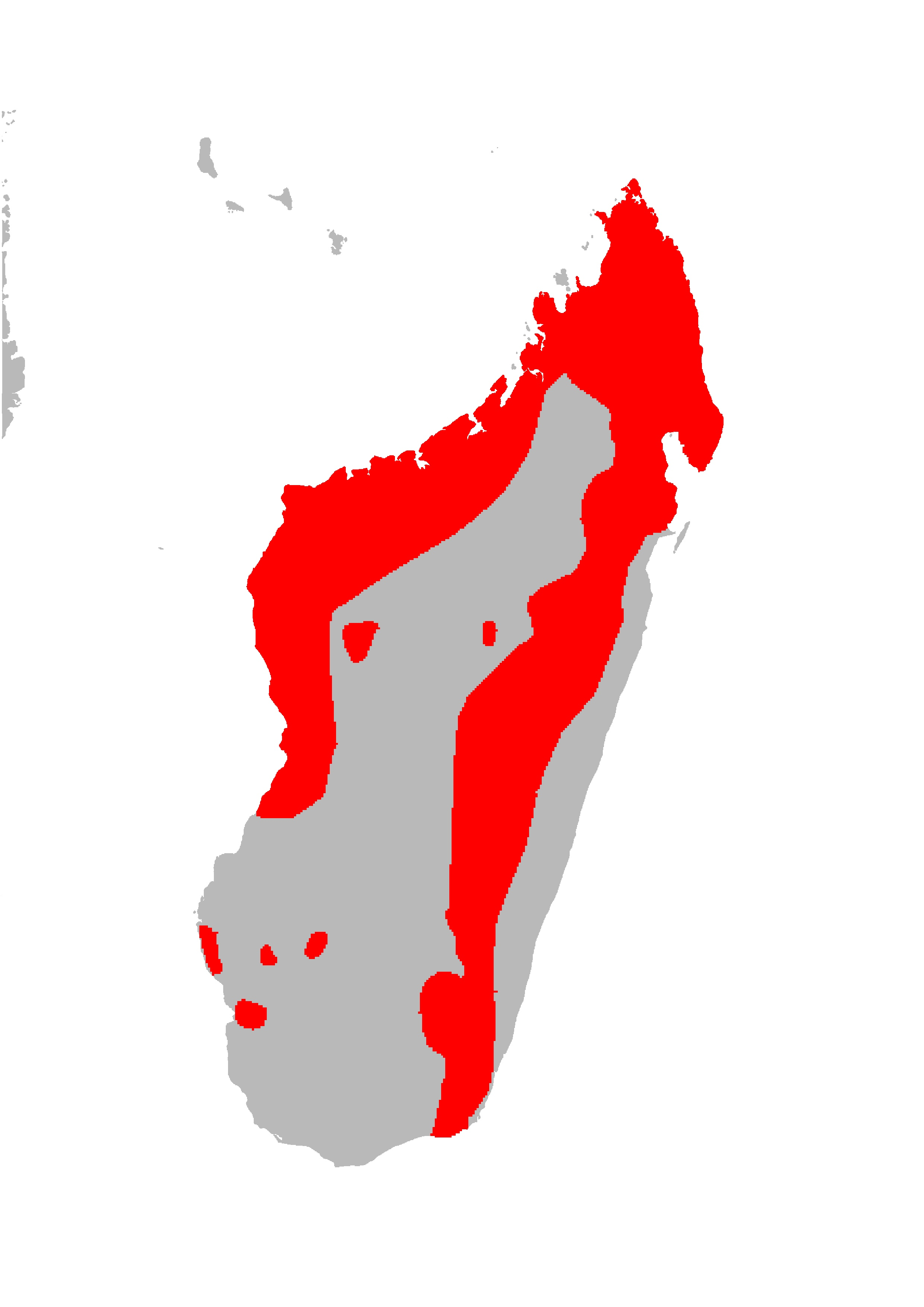

Genus of mammals

Microgale is a genus of mammal in the family Tenrecidae. There are 21 living species on the island of Madagascar and one extinct species known from a fossil. Some species have been discovered in the last twenty years.

On the basis of molecular data indicating that Talazac's shrew tenrec and Dobson's shrew tenrec form a sister group to the rest of Microgale, these two species were transferred from Microgale to Nesogale in 2016. Nesogale and Microgale are estimated to have diverged about 19 million years ago, during the Early Miocene. The web-footed tenrec, M. mergulus, the only semiaquatic member of the genus, was formerly placed in the monotypic genus Limnogale, but was moved in 2016 on the basis of sequence data showing it to be deeply nested within Microgale.

Microgale contains the following extant species:

- Short-tailed shrew tenrec (M. brevicaudata) G. Grandidier, 1899
- Cowan's shrew tenrec (M. cowani) Thomas, 1882
- Drouhard's shrew tenrec (M. drouhardi) G. Grandidier, 1934
- Dryad shrew tenrec (M. dryas) Jenkins, 1992
- Pale shrew tenrec (M. fotsifotsy) Jenkins, Raxworthy & Nussbaum, 1997
- Gracile shrew tenrec (M. gracilis) (Forsyth Major, 1896)
- Grandidier's shrew tenrec (M. grandidieri) Olson et al., 2009
- Naked-nosed shrew tenrec (M. gymnorhyncha) Jenkins et al., 1996
- Jenkins's shrew tenrec (M. jenkinsae) Goodman & Soarimalala, 2004
- Northern shrew tenrec (M. jobihely) Goodman, Raxworthy, Maminirina & Olson, 2006
- Lesser long-tailed shrew tenrec (M. longicaudata) Thomas, 1882
- Major's long-tailed tenrec (M. majori) Thomas, 1918
- Web-footed tenrec (M. mergulus) (Forsyth Major, 1896)
- Montane shrew tenrec (M. monticola) Goodman & Jenkins, 1998
- Nasolo's shrew tenrec (M. nasoloi) Jenkins & Goodman, 1999
- Pygmy shrew tenrec (M. parvula) G. Grandidier, 1934
- Greater long-tailed shrew tenrec (M. principula) Thomas, 1926
- Least shrew tenrec (M. pusilla) Forsyth Major, 1896
- Shrew-toothed shrew tenrec (M. soricoides) Jenkins, 1993
- Taiva shrew tenrec (M. taiva) Forsyth Major, 1896
- Thomas's shrew tenrec (M. thomasi) Forsyth Major, 1896

Shrew tenrecs converged on the shrew like body plan these animals also share the same diversity as shrews with web footed tenrecs closely resembling water shrews.

== Extinct species ==
- Microgale macpheei - subfossil from southeastern Madagascar
