= Hedgehog tenrec =

Hedgehog tenrec may refer to:

- Lesser hedgehog tenrec (Echinops telfairi)
- Greater hedgehog tenrec (Setifer setosus), also known as large Madagascar hedgehog
