= Shrew-toothed shrew tenrec =

Conservation status
- Least Concern (IUCN 3.1)

Scientific classification
- Kingdom: Animalia
- Phylum: Chordata
- Class: Mammalia
- Order: Afrosoricida
- Suborder: Tenrecomorpha
- Family: Tenrecidae
- Genus: Microgale
- Species: M. soricoides

Binomial name
- Microgale soricoides Jenkins, 1993
- Shrew-toothed Shrew Tenrec range

Species of mammal

The shrew-toothed shrew tenrec (Microgale soricoides) is a species of mammal in the family Tenrecidae. It is endemic to Madagascar. Its natural habitat is subtropical or tropical moist forests.
