= Montane shrew tenrec =

Conservation status
- Vulnerable (IUCN 3.1)

Scientific classification
- Kingdom: Animalia
- Phylum: Chordata
- Class: Mammalia
- Order: Afrosoricida
- Suborder: Tenrecomorpha
- Family: Tenrecidae
- Genus: Microgale
- Species: M. monticola

Binomial name
- Microgale monticola Goodman & Jenkins, 1998
- Montane shrew tenrec range

Species of mammal

The montane shrew tenrec (Microgale monticola) is a species of mammal in the family Tenrecidae. It is endemic to Madagascar. Its natural habitat is subtropical or tropical moist montane forests.
