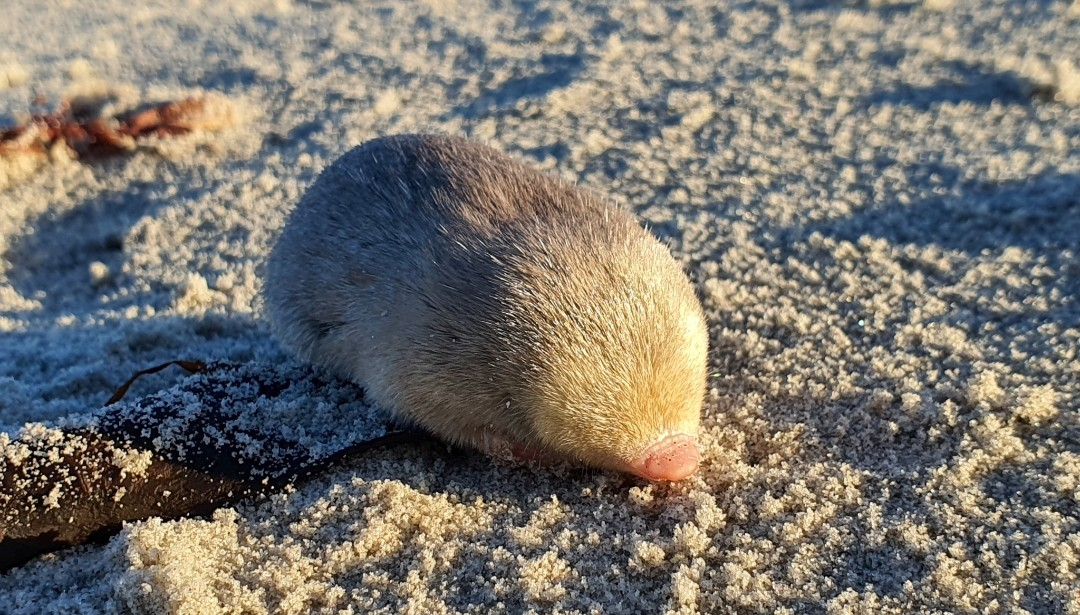

Conservation status
- Critically endangered, possibly extinct (IUCN 3.1)

Scientific classification
- Kingdom: Animalia
- Phylum: Chordata
- Class: Mammalia
- Infraclass: Placentalia
- Order: Afrosoricida
- Family: Chrysochloridae
- Genus: Cryptochloris
- Species: C. wintoni

Binomial name
- Cryptochloris wintoni (Broom, 1907)
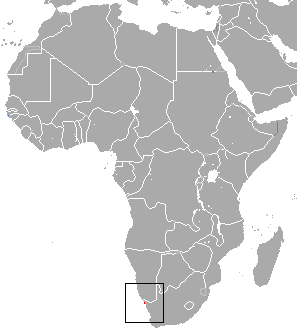
- De Winton's golden mole range

Synonyms
- Cryptochloris zyli wintoni

= De Winton's golden mole =

Species of mammal

De Winton's golden mole (Cryptochloris wintoni) is a species of mammal in the family Chrysochloridae. It is endemic to South Africa. Its natural habitats are subtropical dry shrubland, Mediterranean-type shrubby vegetation, and sandy shores. Following a sighting in 1937, De Winton's golden mole was not observed for over 86 years until its rediscovery in 2023. It is threatened by habitat destruction and is listed by the IUCN, despite the recent sighting, as "critically endangered" and possibly extinct. It was named after British zoologist William Edward de Winton.

== Description ==
De Winton's golden mole resembles Grant's golden mole (Eremitalpa granti) in appearance. The upper parts have short dense fur that is slate-grey with a yellowish tinge. Individual hairs have grey bases, whitish shafts and fawn tips. The face, cheeks and lips have a more intense yellowish tinge. The underparts are rather paler than the upper parts, individual hairs having white tips. The claw on the third digit on the forefoot is about 10.5 mm (0.41 in) long and 4 mm (0.16 in) wide at the base. Claw two is slightly shorter and claw one shorter still, making a pointed digging tool.

== Status ==
De Winton's golden mole is known from a single location. It occupies the same range as Grant's golden mole and the two may have been confused. However, phylogenetic evidence indicates that they are different species, based on differences in the skull, the shape of the malleus and the number of vertebrae. The type location is Port Nolloth, and this mole's habitat is coastal sand dunes and nearby sandy areas. Mining for diamonds near Port Nolloth may be a threat to this species. The International Union for Conservation of Nature now rates this species as "critically endangered" and possibly extinct. As with other golden moles, this species is thought to be very difficult to study or physically observe due to its subterranean nature, although the rarity of C. wintoni makes it even harder to document, in addition to its close resemblance to other, more common golden moles.

In 2017, De Winton's golden mole was listed among the 25 "most wanted lost" species for Re:wild's "Search for Lost Species" initiative, having not been seen since 1937. De Winton's golden mole was rediscovered in 2023 using data and samples from surveys conducted in 2021, including environmental DNA, burrow traces, and sniffer dogs. The findings pointed to a healthy population of De Winton's golden mole in the area. The survey's findings also suggest that the species may be far more widespread than thought, as eDNA evidence was found from Port Nolloth (near the species' original type locality) as far south as Lambert's Bay. However, it is still thought to be very rare over this distribution, and still under threat from mining.
