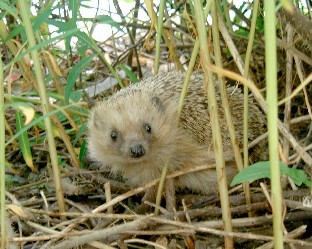
- European hedgehog (Erinaceus europaeus)

Scientific classification
- Kingdom: Animalia
- Phylum: Chordata
- Class: Mammalia
- Infraclass: Placentalia
- Order: Insectivora; Linnaeus, 1758

Groups included
- Eulipotyphla; Dermoptera; Afroinsectivora; Scandentia

= Insectivora =

Now abandoned biological grouping

The order Insectivora (from Latin insectum "insect" and vorare "to eat") is an obsolete biological grouping within the class of mammals. Some species have now been moved out, leaving the remaining ones in the order Eulipotyphla within the larger clade Laurasiatheria, which makes up one of the basal clades of placental mammals.

== History ==
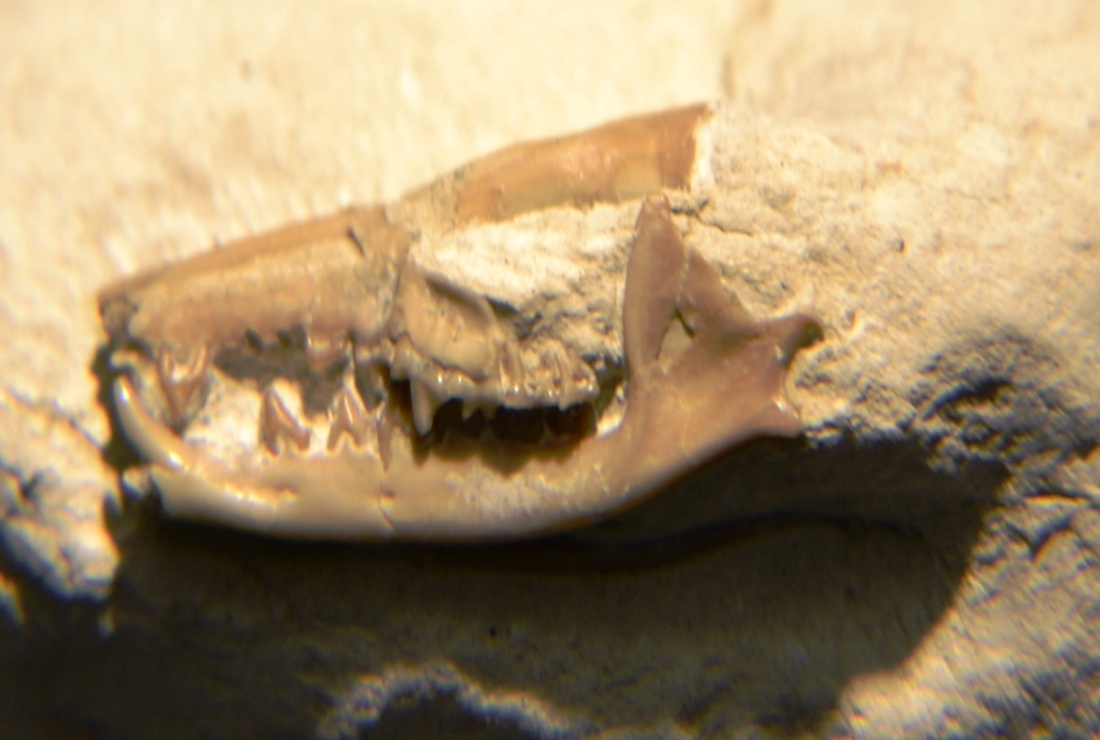
The extinct Centetodon marginalis

Before the era of widespread DNA sequencing, the grouping was used as a polyphyletic taxon for a variety of small to very small, relatively unspecialised mammals that feed upon insects. Since any primitive-looking fossil group of placental mammals was commonly assigned to this order for convenience, it was held to constitute the basal stock out of which other placental orders had evolved. Therefore, at its widest extent, the order Insectivora represented an evolutionary grade rather than a clade.

Taxonomy has been refined in recent years, and treeshrews, elephant shrews, and colugos have now been placed in separate orders, as have many fossil groups that were formerly included here. For some time it was held that the remaining insectivoran families constituted a monophyletic grouping, or clade, to which the name Lipotyphla had long been applied. However, molecular evidence indicated that Chrysochloridae (golden moles), Tenrecidae (tenrecs), and Potamogalidae (otter shrews) should also be separated as a new order Afrosoricida.

Erinaceidae (hedgehogs) was then also split off into a separate order (Erinaceomorpha) from the remainder (termed Soricomorpha), comprising the families Soricidae (shrews), Talpidae (moles), Solenodontidae, and Nesophontidae. These two orders then replaced Insectivora. This scheme was undermined when molecular studies indicated that Soricomorpha is paraphyletic, because Soricidae shared a more recent common ancestor with Erinaceidae than with other soricomorphs.

However, the combination of Soricidae and Erinaceidae, referred to as order Eulipotyphla, has been shown to be monophyletic.

== Classification ==
- Order Eulipotyphla (remnant of 'Insectivora')
  - Family Erinaceidae
    - Subfamily Erinaceinae: hedgehogs
    - Subfamily Hylomyinae: moonrats and gymnures
  - Family Soricidae
    - Subfamily Crocidurinae: white-toothed shrews
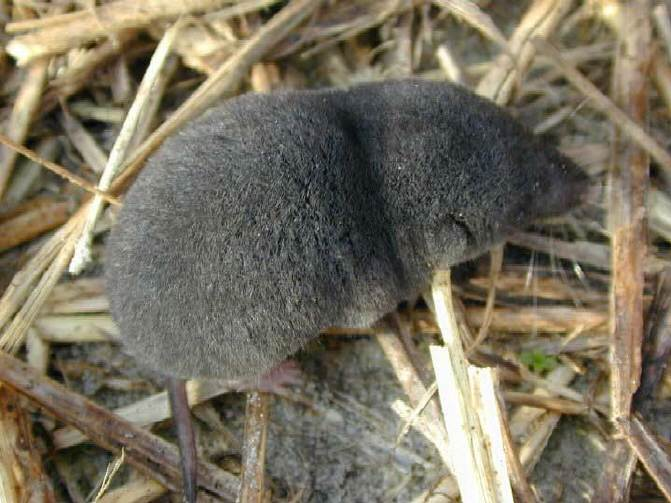
      A shrew
    - Subfamily Soricinae: red-toothed shrews
    - Subfamily Myosoricinae: African white-toothed shrews
  - Family Talpidae
    - Subfamily Desmaninae: desmans
    - Subfamily Talpinae: moles
    - Subfamily Uropsilinae: shrew moles
  - Family Solenodontidae: solenodons
  - Family Nesophontidae: extinct West Indian shrews

Family-level cladogram of extant insectivoran relationships, following Roca et al.:

- Eulipotyphla
  - Solenodontidae
  - - Talpidae
    - - Soricidae
      - Erinaceidae

These families have been placed within Insectivora in the past:

- Family Chrysochloridae (golden moles)
- Family Tenrecidae (tenrecs)
- Family Potamogalidae (otter shrews)
- Family Macroscelididae (elephant shrews)
- Family Tupaiidae (true treeshrews)
- Family Ptilocercidae (pen-tailed treeshrew)
- Family Cynocephalidae (colugos)

Not to be confused with insectivores (the eaters of insects considered as a feeding behavior), many of which do not belong to Eulipotyphla or the other taxa formerly included within Insectivora.

== See also ==
- Afroinsectiphilia
- Lipotyphla, a taxon proposed to replace part of Insectivora but later superseded by Eulipotyphla
