= Nasolo's shrew tenrec =

Conservation status
- Vulnerable (IUCN 3.1)

Scientific classification
- Kingdom: Animalia
- Phylum: Chordata
- Class: Mammalia
- Order: Afrosoricida
- Suborder: Tenrecomorpha
- Family: Tenrecidae
- Genus: Microgale
- Species: M. nasoloi

Binomial name
- Microgale nasoloi Jenkins & Goodman, 1999
- Nasolo's shrew tenrec range

Species of mammal

Nasolo's shrew tenrec (Microgale nasoloi) is a species of mammal in the family Tenrecidae. It is endemic to Madagascar. Its natural habitats are subtropical or tropical moist montane and dry forests.
