= Pale shrew tenrec =

Conservation status
- Least Concern (IUCN 3.1)

Scientific classification
- Kingdom: Animalia
- Phylum: Chordata
- Class: Mammalia
- Order: Afrosoricida
- Suborder: Tenrecomorpha
- Family: Tenrecidae
- Genus: Microgale
- Species: M. fotsifotsy

Binomial name
- Microgale fotsifotsy Jenkins, Raxworthy & Nussbaum, 1997
- Pale shrew tenrec range

Species of mammal

The pale shrew tenrec (Microgale fotsifotsy), also known as the pale-footed shrew tenrec, is a species of mammal in the family Tenrecidae. It is endemic to Madagascar. Its natural habitats are subtropical and tropical moist lowland and montane forests.
