= Dryad shrew tenrec =

Conservation status
- Vulnerable (IUCN 3.1)

Scientific classification
- Kingdom: Animalia
- Phylum: Chordata
- Class: Mammalia
- Order: Afrosoricida
- Suborder: Tenrecomorpha
- Family: Tenrecidae
- Genus: Microgale
- Species: M. dryas

Binomial name
- Microgale dryas Jenkins, 1992
- Dryad shrew tenrec range

Species of mammal

The dryad shrew tenrec (Microgale dryas), also known as the tree shrew tenrec, is a species of mammal in the family Tenrecidae. It is endemic to Madagascar. Its natural habitat is subtropical or tropical moist lowland forests.
