= Gracile shrew tenrec =

Conservation status
- Least Concern (IUCN 3.1)

Scientific classification
- Kingdom: Animalia
- Phylum: Chordata
- Class: Mammalia
- Order: Afrosoricida
- Suborder: Tenrecomorpha
- Family: Tenrecidae
- Genus: Microgale
- Species: M. gracilis

Binomial name
- Microgale gracilis (Forsyth Major, 1896)
- Gracile shrew tenrec range

Species of mammal

The gracile shrew tenrec (Microgale gracilis) is a species of mammal in the family Tenrecidae. It is endemic to Madagascar. Its natural habitat is subtropical or tropical moist montane forests.
