= Thomas's shrew tenrec =

Conservation status
- Least Concern (IUCN 3.1)

Scientific classification
- Kingdom: Animalia
- Phylum: Chordata
- Class: Mammalia
- Order: Afrosoricida
- Suborder: Tenrecomorpha
- Family: Tenrecidae
- Genus: Microgale
- Species: M. thomasi

Binomial name
- Microgale thomasi Forsyth Major, 1896
- Thomas's shrew tenrec range

Species of mammal

Thomas's shrew tenrec (Microgale thomasi) is a species of mammal in the family Tenrecidae. It is endemic to Madagascar. Its natural habitat is subtropical or tropical moist lowland forests.
