= Least shrew tenrec =

Conservation status
- Least Concern (IUCN 3.1)

Scientific classification
- Kingdom: Animalia
- Phylum: Chordata
- Class: Mammalia
- Order: Afrosoricida
- Suborder: Tenrecomorpha
- Family: Tenrecidae
- Genus: Microgale
- Species: M. pusilla

Binomial name
- Microgale pusilla Forsyth Major, 1896
- Least shrew tenrec range

Synonyms
- Microgale majori Thomas, 1918

Species of mammal

The least shrew tenrec (Microgale pusilla) is a species of mammal in the family Tenrecidae. It is endemic to Madagascar. Its natural habitats are subtropical or tropical moist forests, swamps, pastureland, and irrigated land.
