= Naked-nosed shrew tenrec =

Conservation status
- Least Concern (IUCN 3.1)

Scientific classification
- Kingdom: Animalia
- Phylum: Chordata
- Class: Mammalia
- Order: Afrosoricida
- Suborder: Tenrecomorpha
- Family: Tenrecidae
- Genus: Microgale
- Species: M. gymnorhyncha

Binomial name
- Microgale gymnorhyncha Jenkins et al., 1996
- Naked-nosed shrew tenrec range

Species of mammal

The naked-nosed shrew tenrec (Microgale gymnorhyncha) is a species of mammal in the family Tenrecidae. It is endemic to Madagascar. Its natural habitats are subtropical and tropical moist lowland and montane forests.
