= Nanogale =

Nanogale Temporal range: Middle Eocene

Scientific classification
- Kingdom: Animalia
- Phylum: Chordata
- Class: Mammalia
- Order: Afrosoricida
- Suborder: Tenrecomorpha
- Genus: †Nanogale
- Species: †N. fragilis

Binomial name
- †Nanogale fragilis Pickford, 2019

Nanogale is an extinct genus of tenrecomorph from the Eocene of Namibia. It is a monotypic genus containing the species N. fragilis.
