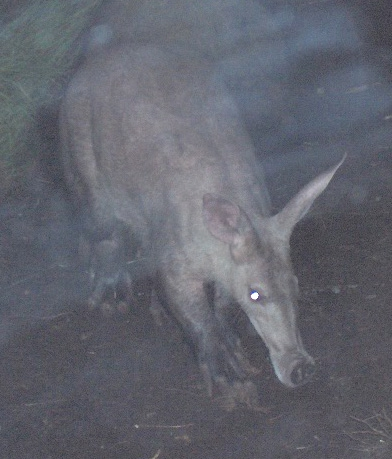
- Aardvark

Scientific classification
- Kingdom: Animalia
- Phylum: Chordata
- Class: Mammalia
- Subclass: Eutheria
- Superorder: Afrotheria
- (unranked): Pseudungulata

Orders
- Tubulidentata; Paenungulata; Hyracoidea; Sirenia; Proboscidea

= Pseudoungulata =

Pseudoungulata Temporal range: Eocene? - Recent

Pseudoungulata, or "false hoofed mammals", is a possible clade made up of two subgroups, aardvarks and paenungulates (hyraxes, elephants, and sirenians). Before this group was proposed, it was thought that aardvarks were more closely related to xenarthrans. However, all of these mammals are now considered to be part of Afrotheria, which also includes elephant shrews and afrosoricidans. Other positions of aardvarks within Afrotheria are possible, such as being closest relatives of elephant shrews and/or afrosoricidans.
