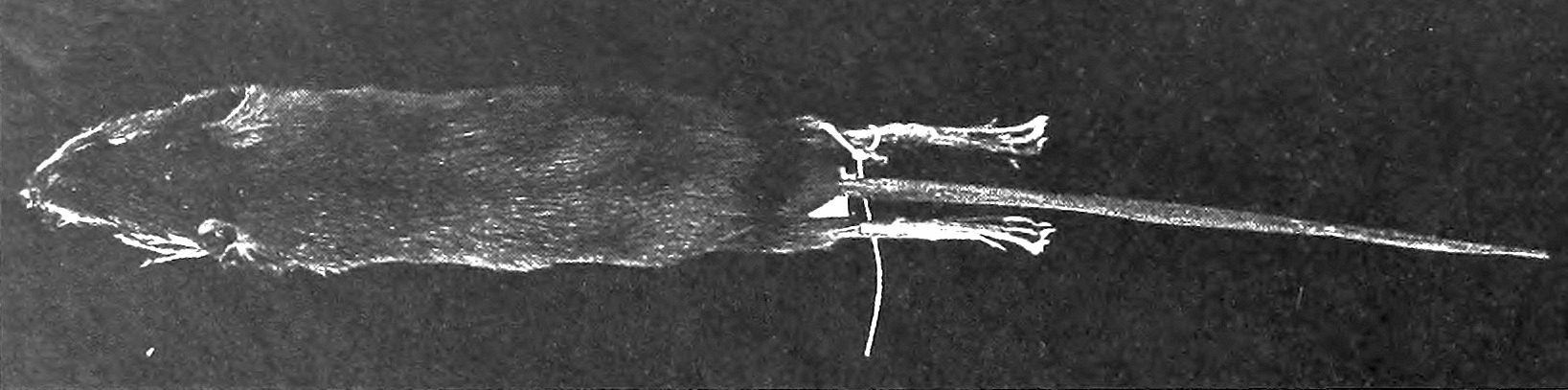

Conservation status
- Least Concern (IUCN 3.1)

Scientific classification
- Kingdom: Animalia
- Phylum: Chordata
- Class: Mammalia
- Order: Afrosoricida
- Suborder: Tenrecomorpha
- Family: Tenrecidae
- Genus: Microgale
- Species: M. drouhardi

Binomial name
- Microgale drouhardi G. Grandidier, 1934
- Drouhard's shrew tenrec range

= Drouhard's shrew tenrec =

Species of mammal

Drouhard's shrew tenrec (Microgale drouhardi), also known as the striped shrew tenrec, is a species of mammal in the family Tenrecidae. It is endemic to Madagascar. Its natural habitats are subtropical and tropical moist lowland and montane forests.
