= Pygmy shrew tenrec =

Conservation status
- Least Concern (IUCN 3.1)

Scientific classification
- Kingdom: Animalia
- Phylum: Chordata
- Class: Mammalia
- Order: Afrosoricida
- Suborder: Tenrecomorpha
- Family: Tenrecidae
- Genus: Microgale
- Species: M. parvula

Binomial name
- Microgale parvula G. Grandidier, 1934
- Pygmy shrew tenrec range

Synonyms
- Microgale pulla Jenkins, 1988

Species of mammal

The pygmy shrew tenrec (Microgale parvula) is a species of placental mammal in the family Tenrecidae. It is endemic to Madagascar. Its natural habitat is subtropical or tropical moist forests. While it is not endangered, its population is slowly declining as it experiences habitat loss.

== Habitat and Diet ==
This tenrec has a habitat that stretches from the southern part of the island of Madagascar to the northern peninsula, making it one of the only rodent-like creatures to live in this particular part of the island where species diversity is reduced. It is restricted to intact forest areas for the most part and has an altitude range of between 100 and 1,990 m asl. Like most other tenrecs, the pygmy shrew tenrec is an insectivore.

== History ==
The species was catalogued by G. Grandidier in 1934. While the exact parameters of the species and its populations were unknown until the mid 1990s, it was listed as "Endangered" in 1996 when scientists found sufficient data to back up the category. This was recently redacted and changed to "Least Concern" in 2006.

== Behavior ==
The pygmy shrew tenrec is a nocturnal hunter, with keen senses of sight and hearing, as is typical of shrew tenrecs.

Like most mammals, this tenrec is polygynous, meaning males mate with two or more females. It is still unknown whether sexual selection occurs through male on male competition or through female choice.
