= Visagie's golden mole =

Conservation status
- Data Deficient (IUCN 3.1)

Scientific classification
- Kingdom: Animalia
- Phylum: Chordata
- Class: Mammalia
- Order: Afrosoricida
- Family: Chrysochloridae
- Genus: Chrysochloris
- Species: C. visagiei

Binomial name
- Chrysochloris visagiei Broom, 1950
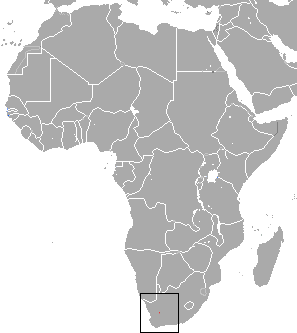
- Visagie's golden mole range

Synonyms
- Chrysochloris asiatica visagiei

Species of mammal

Visagie's golden mole (Chrysochloris visagiei) is a small, insectivorous mammal of the family Chrysochloridae, the golden moles, endemic to South Africa.
