= Greater long-tailed shrew tenrec =

Conservation status
- Least Concern (IUCN 3.1)

Scientific classification
- Kingdom: Animalia
- Phylum: Chordata
- Class: Mammalia
- Order: Afrosoricida
- Suborder: Tenrecomorpha
- Family: Tenrecidae
- Genus: Microgale
- Species: M. principula

Binomial name
- Microgale principula Thomas, 1926
- Greater long-tailed shrew tenrec range

Species of mammal

The greater long-tailed shrew tenrec (Microgale principula) is a species of mammal in the family Tenrecidae. It is endemic to Madagascar, where its natural habitats are subtropical or tropical moist forests.

== Distribution and habitat ==
The greater long-tailed shrew tenrec is found in eastern Madagascar at altitudes between 440 and 1,950 metres (1,440 and 6,400 ft) above sea level, its range extending from Marojejy southwards to Andohahela. It is an arboreal species and is found in both primary and somewhat degraded humid forests.

== Andrahomana Cave ==
The greater long-tailed shrew tenrec is one of eight species of Microgale tenrecs whose remains have been found in deposits in caverns at Andrahomana on the southern coast of Madagascar alongside the bones of extinct birds including elephant birds and Malagasy sheldgoose. The latter, a waterbird, indicates that a large body of fresh water may have been nearby and moister conditions were probably present in the past. The creatures may have fallen into the cave system through "skylights" in the roof. The cave is outside the present day range of the greater long-tailed shrew tenrec.

== Status ==
Besides the risk of wildfire, the main threats faced by the greater long-tailed shrew tenrec are destruction of its forest habitat by logging and by its conversion into agricultural land. However the animal's range is wide, it is common in many places and presumably has a large total population, and it is present in a number of protected areas, so the International Union for Conservation of Nature has assessed its conservation status as being of "least concern".
