= Microgale grandidieri =

Conservation status
- Least Concern (IUCN 3.1)

Scientific classification
- Kingdom: Animalia
- Phylum: Chordata
- Class: Mammalia
- Order: Afrosoricida
- Suborder: Tenrecomorpha
- Family: Tenrecidae
- Genus: Microgale
- Species: M. grandidieri

Binomial name
- Microgale grandidieri Olson et al., 2009
- Grandidier's shrew tenrec range

Species of mammal

Microgale grandidieri, also known as Grandidier's shrew tenrec, is a species of shrew tenrec occurring in the dry forests of western and southwestern Madagascar. Populations of this species were formerly included in Microgale brevicaudata; M. grandidieri was described as a separate species in 2009 based on differences in morphology and DNA sequences.
