= Chrysochloris =

Scientific classification
- Domain: Eukaryota
- Kingdom: Animalia
- Phylum: Chordata
- Class: Mammalia
- Order: Afrosoricida
- Family: Chrysochloridae
- Subfamily: Chrysochlorinae
- Genus: Chrysochloris; Lacépède, 1799

Type species
- Chrysochloris capensis Lacépède, 1799 (= Talpa asiatica Linnaeus, 1758)

Species
- Subgenus Chrysochloris; Chrysochloris asiatica; Chrysochloris visagiei; Subgenus Kilimatalpa; Chrysochloris stuhlmanni
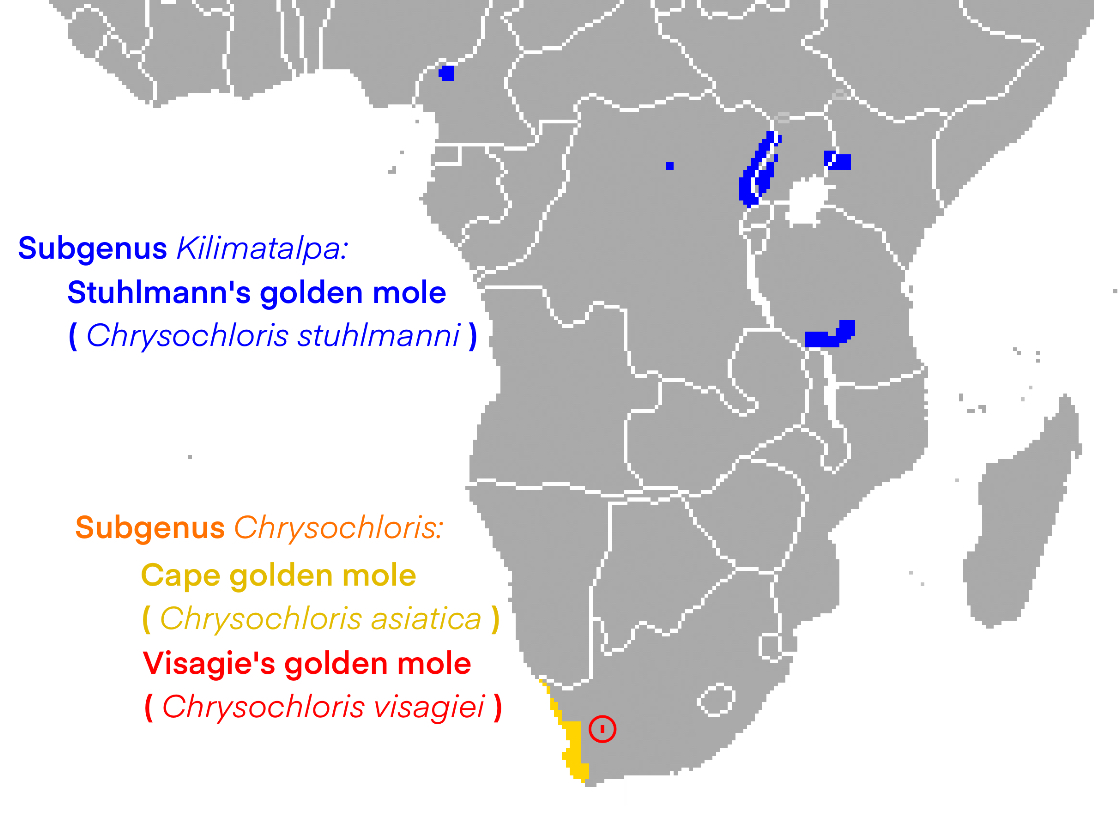

Genus of mammals

Chrysochloris is a genus of mammal in the family Chrysochloridae. It contains the following species:

- Subgenus Chrysochloris
  - Cape golden mole (Chrysochloris asiatica)
  - Visagie's golden mole (Chrysochloris visagiei)
- Subgenus Kilimatalpa
  - Stuhlmann's golden mole (Chrysochloris stuhlmanni)
