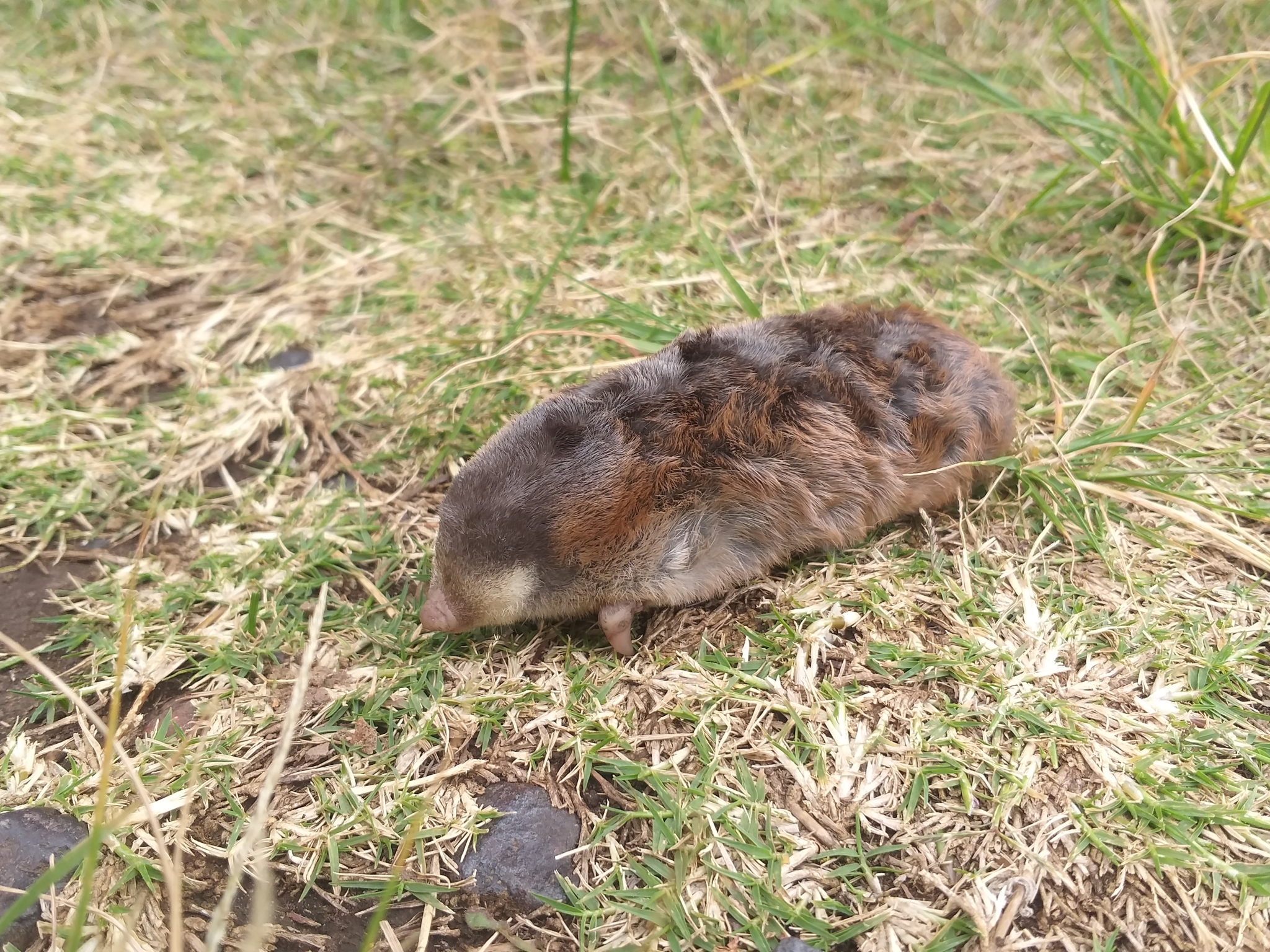
- Cape golden mole adult

Conservation status
- Least Concern (IUCN 3.1)

Scientific classification
- Kingdom: Animalia
- Phylum: Chordata
- Class: Mammalia
- Order: Afrosoricida
- Family: Chrysochloridae
- Genus: Chrysochloris
- Species: C. asiatica

Binomial name
- Chrysochloris asiatica (Linnaeus, 1758)
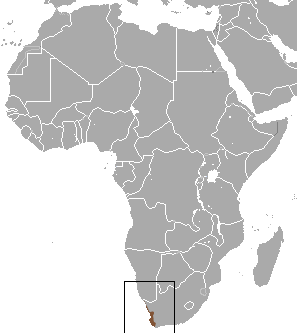
- Cape golden mole range

Synonyms
- List: Chrysochloris asiatica bayoni De Beaux, 1921; Chrysochloris capensis Lacépède, 1799; Chrysochloris calviniae Shortridge, 1942; Chrysochloris concolor Shortridge & Carter, 1938; Chrysochloris damarensis Ogilby, 1838; Chrysochloris dixoni Broom, 1946; Chrysochloris elegans Broom, 1946; Chrysochloris minor Roberts, 1919; Chrysochloris namaquensis Broom, 1907; Chrysochloris rubra Lacépède, 1799; Chrysochloris shortridgei Broom, 1946; Chrysochloris taylori Broom, 1950; Chrysochloris tenuis Broom, 1907; Chrysochloris visserae Broom, 1950; Sorex auratus Vosmaer, 1787; Talpa asiatica Linnaeus, 1758; Talpa aurea Pallas, 1778; Talpa inaurata Pallas, 1777

= Cape golden mole =

Chrysochloris asiatica

Species of mammal

The Cape golden mole (Chrysochloris asiatica) is a small, insectivorous mammal of the family Chrysochloridae, the golden moles. The species is a solitary subterranean insectivore, confined to the coastal regions of the southwestern and southern Cape in South Africa. When foraging for small, soil invertebrates and small lizards, these golden moles excavate superficial burrows using their conical nose shield and highly modified forefeet. Females are smaller than males. Golden moles have very dense, soft, and silky coats. The coats are colored blackish to slaty-grey and brown to pale fawn. They have also been observed to venture onto sandy beaches, presumably to feed on amphipods and isopods occurring there.
