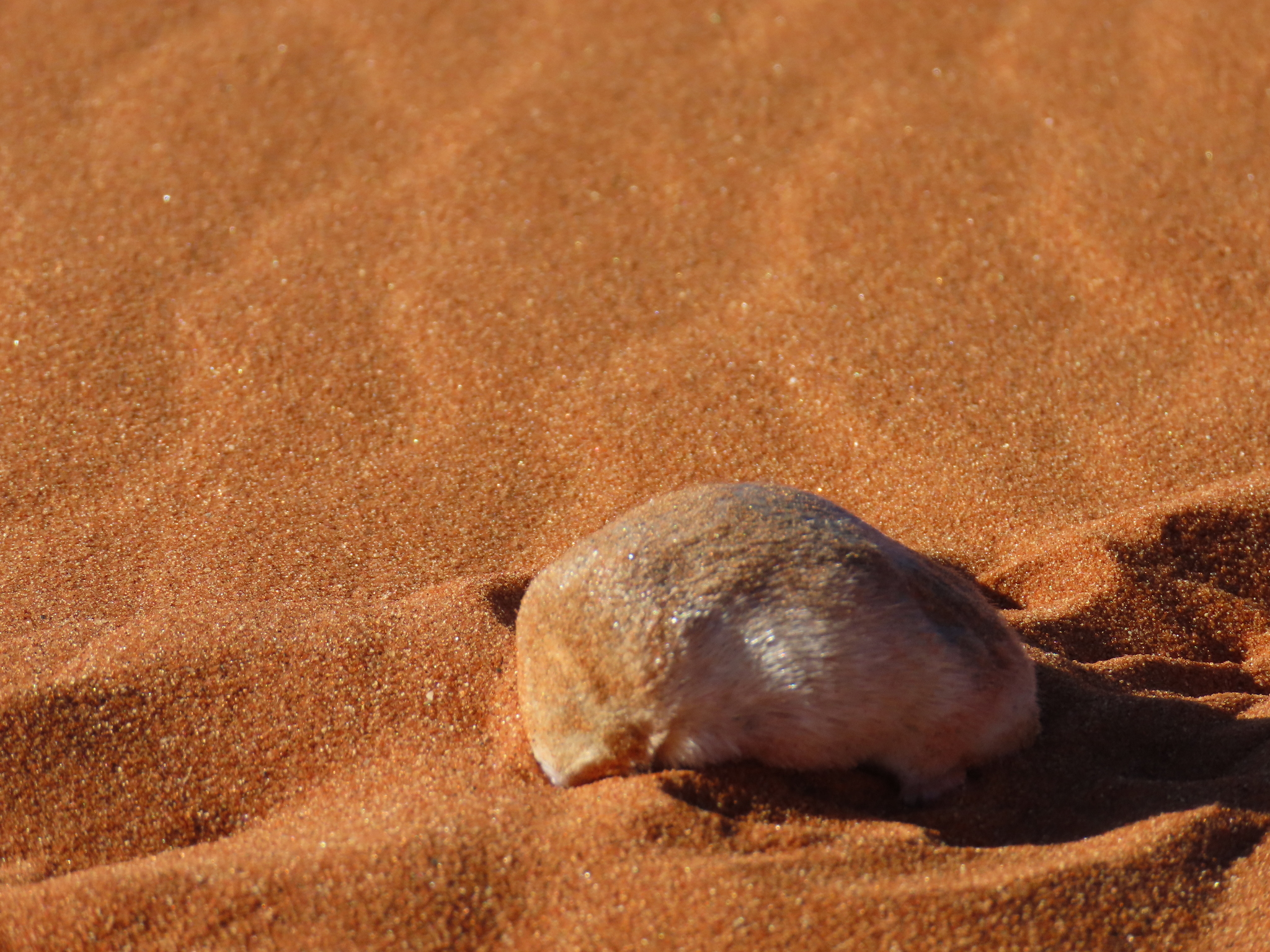
- Namib golden mole (Eremitalpa granti ssp. namibensis)

Conservation status
- Least Concern (IUCN 3.1)

Scientific classification
- Kingdom: Animalia
- Phylum: Chordata
- Class: Mammalia
- Order: Afrosoricida
- Family: Chrysochloridae
- Genus: Eremitalpa; Roberts, 1924
- Species: E. granti

Binomial name
- Eremitalpa granti (Broom, 1907)

Subspecies
- E. g. granti E. g. namibensis
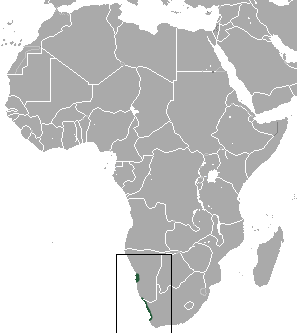
- Grant's golden mole range

= Grant's golden mole =

Species of mammal

Grant's golden mole (Eremitalpa granti; colloquially also: dune shark) is a golden mole species. It is the only member of the genus Eremitalpa.

== Description ==
Like all other golden moles, the build of these animals is similar to the moles, though they are not closely related, and are adapted to a life of digging. The front extremities are remodelled to digging claws; in contrast to most other species of its family, they have three claws each. The tail is physically not visible, there are no auricles, the eyes are covered with fur, and the mouth is bearing a leather-like pad, which also serves for digging.

Grant's golden moles have long silky fur, which is coloured grey on cubs and sandy on older animals. With a length of 7.5 to 9 cm (3.0 to 3.5 in) and a weight of 15 to 25 g (0.53 to 0.88 oz) it is the smallest member of family Chrysocholoridae.

== Geographical distribution and habitat ==
Grant's golden mole lives on the western coast of South Africa and in south western Namibia. Its natural habitat is dry areas, mostly sandy deserts.

== Diet and social behaviour ==
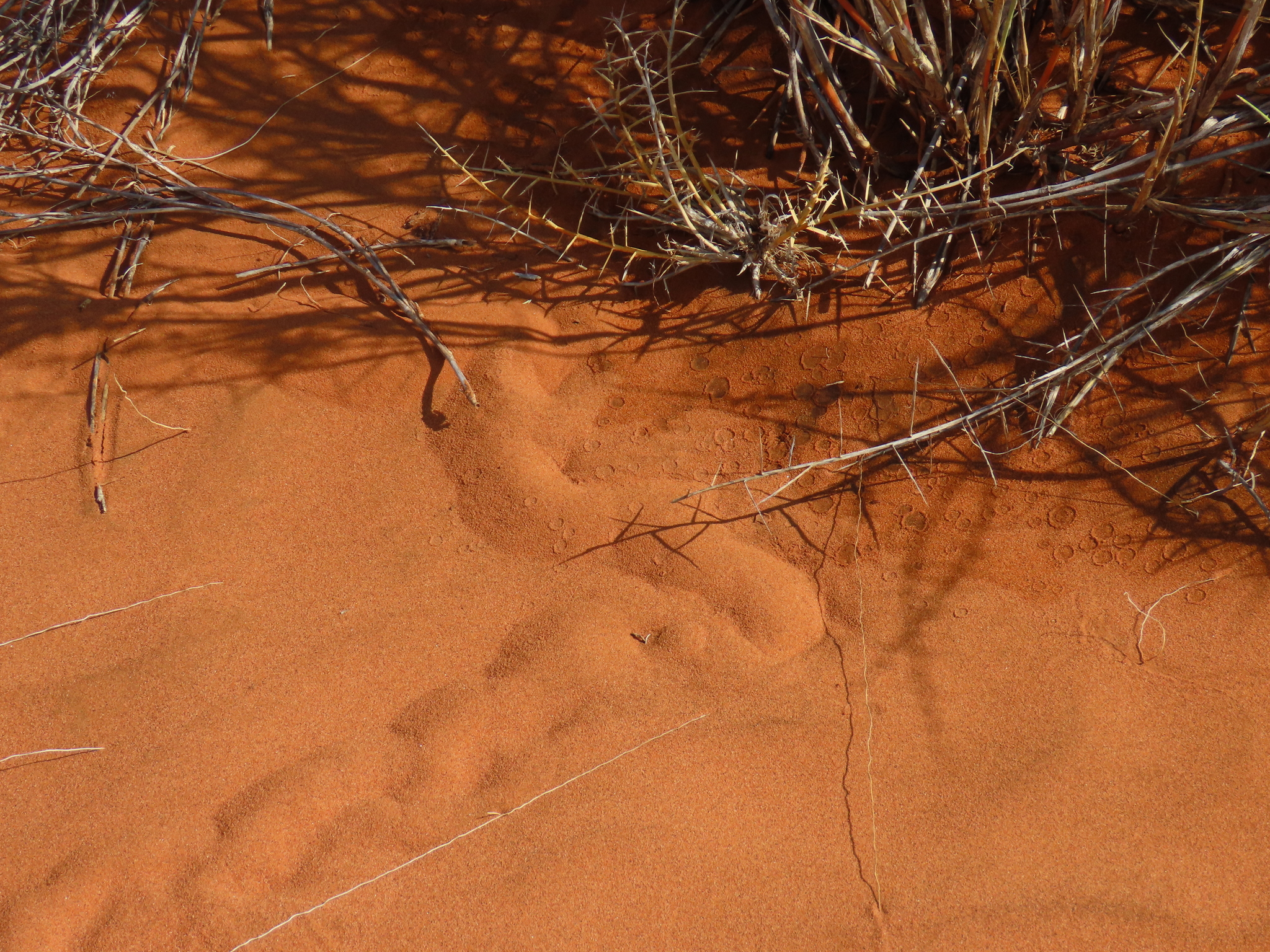
The Namib golden mole sheltering under vegetation

In contrast to many other golden moles, Grant's golden mole rarely builds lasting tunnels. It "swims" through the sand just under or on the surface while searching for food. It is mainly a nocturnal animal, resting by day in small caves beneath sheltering plants. It is a solitary animal, with stomping grounds averaging 4.6 ha. When foraging at night, the animal will alternate between moving over the surface sand, dipping its head into the substrate (detecting low frequency vibrations through the ground) and "swimming" through the sand.

Besides termites (which constitute the majority of its food) and other invertebrates, its diet consists of reptiles such as skinks.

== Taxonomy ==
There are two subspecies:

- West Coast dune golden mole (Eremitalpa granti ssp. granti)
- Namib golden mole (Eremitalpa granti ssp. namibensis)

== Conservation status ==
This species has been classified by the IUCN Red List as LC (Least Concern) globally. However, the Endangered Wildlife Trust of South Africa regards the nominate subspecies as a Vulnerable species.
