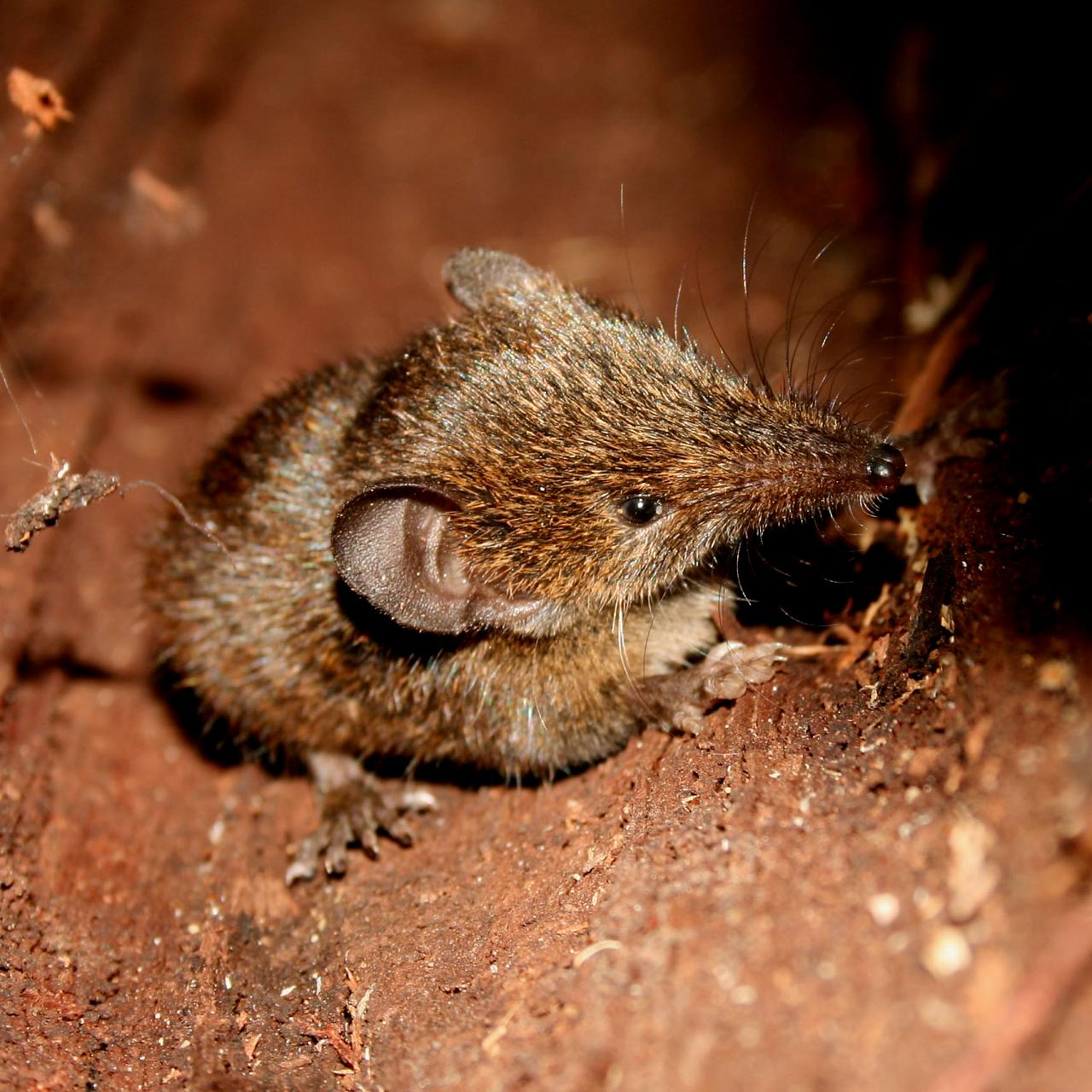

Conservation status
- Least Concern (IUCN 3.1)

Scientific classification
- Kingdom: Animalia
- Phylum: Chordata
- Class: Mammalia
- Order: Afrosoricida
- Suborder: Tenrecomorpha
- Family: Tenrecidae
- Genus: Microgale
- Species: M. cowani

Binomial name
- Microgale cowani Thomas, 1882
- Cowan's shrew tenrec range

= Cowan's shrew tenrec =

Species of mammal

Cowan's shrew tenrec (Microgale cowani) is a species of mammal in the family Tenrecidae.

== Description ==
Cowan's shrew tenrecs weigh an average just over 10 g (0.35 oz), and have an average length of slightly over 5 in (130 mm). Most specimens are mostly brown, often having a mid-dorsal stripe of a darker color and a lighter belly. The coat of Cowan's shrew tenrecs contains a wide variety of patterns, mostly consisting of various shades of red and brown.

Cowan's shrew tenrecs are mostly solitary animals. When two males are in close quarters, they will often try to squeal at or bite each other. Cowan's shrew tenrecs are carnivores, and will search for small prey on forest floors. Their predators are mostly other vertebrates, such as owls and sometimes even other shrew tenrecs. Their only major defense against these predators is the ability to camouflage.

== Habitat and distribution ==
Cowan's shrew tenrec is endemic to Madagascar. It is found in the most habitats of any other shrew tenrec, with its natural habitats being subtropical or tropical moist lowland forest, subtropical or tropical moist montane forest, plantations, and heavily degraded former forest. It lives at elevations from about 800 to 2,500 meters (2,600 to 8,200 ft).
