= Lesser long-tailed shrew tenrec =

Conservation status
- Least Concern (IUCN 3.1)

Scientific classification
- Kingdom: Animalia
- Phylum: Chordata
- Class: Mammalia
- Order: Afrosoricida
- Suborder: Tenrecomorpha
- Family: Tenrecidae
- Genus: Microgale
- Species: M. longicaudata

Binomial name
- Microgale longicaudata Thomas, 1882
- Lesser long-tailed shrew tenrec range

Species of mammal

The lesser long-tailed shrew tenrec (Microgale longicaudata) is a species of mammal in the family Tenrecidae. It is active at all hours of the day and night, but each individual maintains its own pattern of rest and activity.

== Range and Habitat ==
It is endemic to Madagascar. Its natural habitats are subtropical and tropical moist lowland and montane forests.

== Description ==
As its name implies, it occupies the ecological niche filled by shrews in other parts of the world. The coat is short, but dense, and quite lacking in the spines so common in this family. The long tail is prehensile. Its body is 5–15 cm long, with the tail being 7.5–17 cm long.

== Diet ==
Although it climbs well, it usually mostly forages on the forest floor for soil invertebrates like grubs, worms and small insects.

== Reproduction ==
Little is known, but they are believed to produce litters of 2-4 young. They do not appear to hibernate at all.
