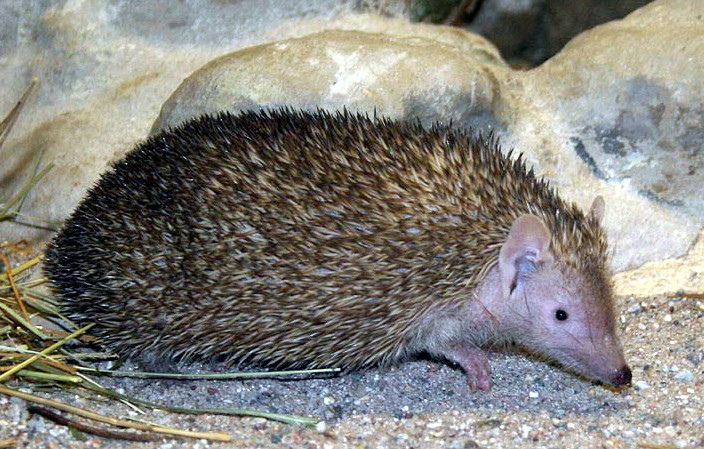
- Lesser hedgehog tenrec (Echinops telfairi)
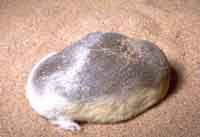
- Grant's golden mole (Eremitalpa granti)

Scientific classification
- Kingdom: Animalia
- Phylum: Chordata
- Class: Mammalia
- Infraclass: Placentalia
- Mirorder: Afroinsectivora
- Order: Afrosoricida; Stanhope MJ, Waddell VG, Madsen O, de Jong W, Hedges SB, Cleven G, Kao D, Springer MS, 1998

Subclades
- †Afrodon †Dilambdogale †Protenrec †Todralestes †Widanelfarasia ?†Adapisoriculidae; Chrysochloridea; Tenrecomorpha
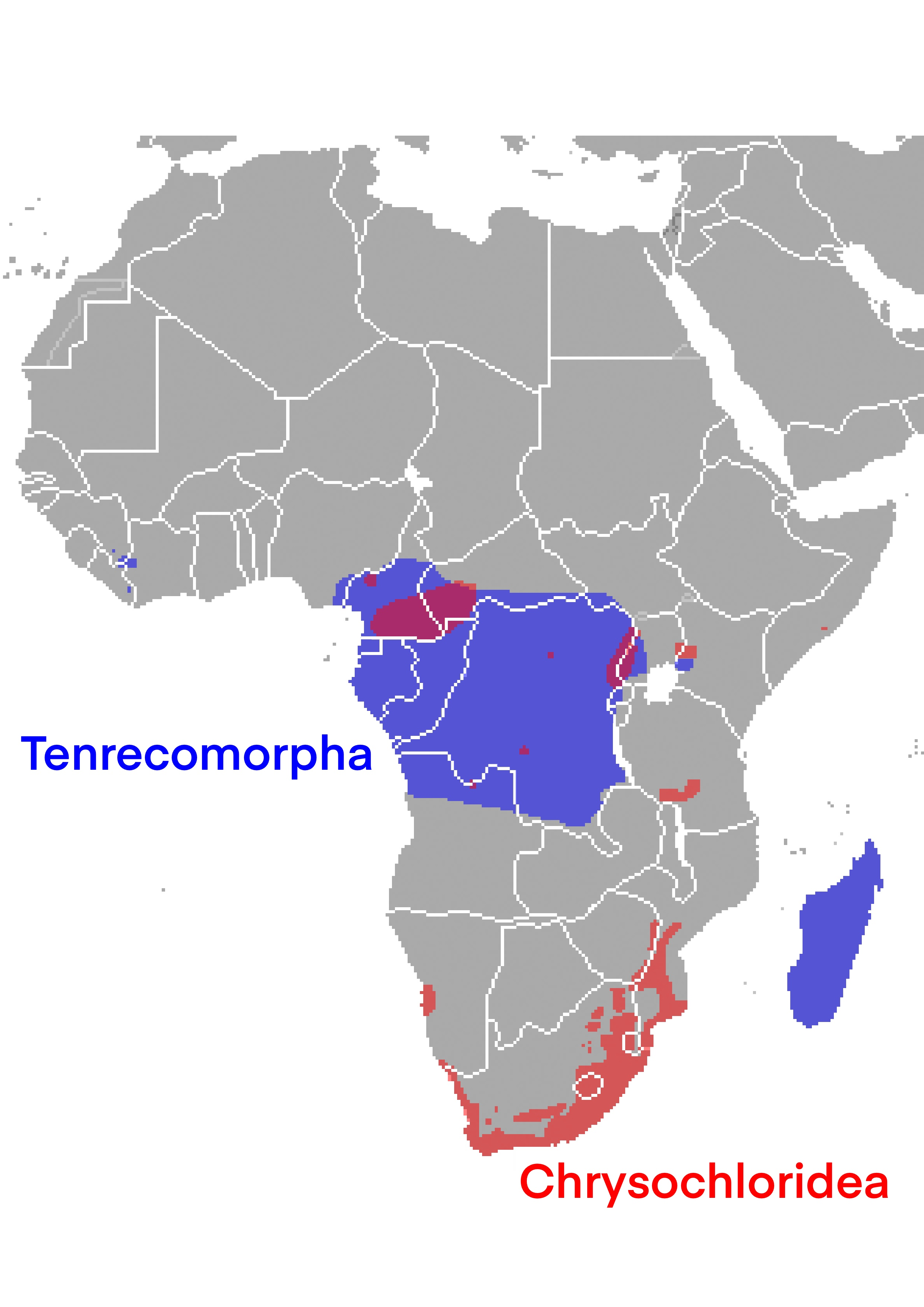

= Afrosoricida =

Afrosoricida Temporal range: Eocene–Recent

Order of mammals

The order Afrosoricida (/ˌæfroʊsəˈrɪsɪdə/; a Latin-Greek compound name which means "looking like African shrews") contains the golden moles of Southern Africa, the otter shrews of equatorial Africa, and the tenrecs of Madagascar. These three groups of small mammals were for most of the 19th and 20th centuries regarded as a part of the Insectivora or Lipotyphla, but both of those groups, as traditionally used, are polyphyletic.

== Naming ==
Some biologists use Tenrecoidea or Tenrecomorpha as the name for the tenrec-golden mole clade and regard Afrosoricida as a junior synonym (though the rules of the ICZN do not apply above the Linnean rank of family). This is based on the principles of Simpson, summarized by Asher & Helgen to mean that "priority and stability should comprise the overriding principles by which new, high-level taxa are named. Established names for any given clade should not be altered unless the name with precedent unambiguously threatens stability." When "Afrosoricida" was first named in 1998, Afrosorex was a subgenus of Crocidura and McDowell had used the name Tenrecoidea for the same clade of golden moles and tenrecs. Gary Bronner and Paula Jenkins referred to "Afrosoricida" in their chapter in Wilson & Reeder as "... inappropriate since this clade does not include soricids, and could lead to confusion with the soricid subgenus Afrosorex" but still kept it due to their perception that the name was "entrenched in the recent literature" and because of the admittedly confusing history of terms like Tenrecoidea and Tenrecomorpha. Asher & Helgen presented their views on the appropriateness of these and other high-level taxa, including a response to Hedges, who supported keeping "Afrosoricida".

== Biology ==
As a rule, tenrecs and otter shrews tend to be small animals varying from 4 to 39 cm (1.6 to 15.4 in) in length. No pronounced body type is seen, since they have evolved to occupy a number of small-bodied, faunivorous niches in Madagascar (tenrecines) and mainland Africa (potamogalines). However, certain species bear some ecological similarity to hedgehogs, soricid shrews, or miniature otters. Their coat can vary from smooth to spiny and the coloration of the fur can also vary from brown or gray to other hues (see for photos on the ASM library). Most species are also nocturnal and have poor eyesight. Their whiskers are rather sensitive and they can detect very minute vibrations in the ground to locate their prey.

Unusual among placentals, afrosoricids have a cloaca, which is the rear orifice that functions as the opening for the urinary, digestive, and reproductive tracts.

== Phylogeny ==
Traditionally, these two families were grouped with the hedgehogs, shrews and moles in the Lipotyphla. However, minority opinions have always suggested that the Tenrecoidea, or at least the golden moles, are not true lipotyphlans. For example, Robert Broom wrote in 1916 that "examination of the skull confirms ... that Chrysochloris is not a near ally of Centetes" (i.e., Tenrec ecaudatus) "and that it is not an Insectivore". These opinions are now supported by many genetic studies indicating an association between tenrecoids and various other African mammals in the Afrotheria. Tenrecs and golden moles are sometimes considered part of the Afroinsectiphilia, a clade within Afrotheria.

=== Cladogram of living Afrosoricida ===
The generally accepted cladogram of living Afrosoricida is:

- Afrosoricida
  - Chrysochloridea
    - Chrysochloridae
      - - Eremitalpa
          E. granti
      - - - Kilimatalpa
            - K. stuhlmanni
          - Chrysochloris
            - C. asiatica
            - C. wintoni
        - - - Chrysospalax trevelyani
            - Calcochloris obtusirostris
          - - Chlorotalpa
              - C. duthieae
              - C. sclateri
            - Amblysomus
              - - A. hottentotus
              - - A. marleyi
                - A. septentrionalis
                - - - A. arendsi
                  - - A. gunningi
                    - A. julianae
  - Tenrecomorpha
    - Potamogalidae
      - Micropotamogale
        - M. lamottei
        - M. ruwenzorii
      - Potamogale
        - P. velox
    - Tenrecidae
      - Tenrecinae
        - - Hemicentetes semispinosus
          - Tenrec ecaudatus
        - - Echinops telfairi
          - Setifer setosus
      - - - Geogale
            - G. aurita
        - Oryzorictinae
          - Oryzorictes
            - O. hova
          - Microgale
            - - M. talazaci
              - M. dobsoni
            - - - M. cowani
              - - M. brevicaudata
                - M. grandidieri
            - - M. mergulus
              - - M. pusilla
                - - M. majori
                  - - M. principula
                    - M. longicaudata

=== Species ===
- Infraclass Eutheria: placental mammals
  - Superorder Afrotheria
    - Clade Afroinsectiphilia
      - Clade Afroinsectivora
        - Order Afrosoricida
          - Suborder Tenrecomorpha (otter shrews and tenrecs)
            - Family Potamogalidae (otter shrews)
              - Genus Micropotamogale
                - Nimba otter shrew (Micropotamogale lamottei)
                - Ruwenzori otter shrew (Micropotamogale ruwenzorii)
              - Genus Potamogale
                - Giant otter shrew (Potamogale velox)
            - Family Plesiorycteropodidae
              - Genus †Plesiorycteropus
                - †Plesiorycteropus madagascariensis
                - †Plesiorycteropus germainepetterae
            - Family Tenrecidae (tenrecs)
              - Subfamily Geogalinae (1 species)
                - Genus Geogale
                  - Large-eared tenrec (Geogale aurita)
              - Subfamily Oryzorictinae (24 species)
                - Genus Microgale
                  - Short-tailed shrew tenrec (Microgale brevicaudata)
                  - Cowan's shrew tenrec (Microgale cowani)
                  - Drouhard's shrew tenrec (Microgale drouhardi)
                  - Dryad shrew tenrec (Microgale dryas)
                  - Pale shrew tenrec (Microgale fotsifotsy)
                  - Gracile shrew tenrec (Microgale gracilis)
                  - Naked-nosed shrew tenrec (Microgale gymnorhyncha)
                  - Jenkins's shrew tenrec (Microgale jenkinsae)
                  - Northern shrew tenrec (Microgale jobihely)
                  - Lesser long-tailed shrew tenrec (Microgale longicaudata)
                  - Major's long-tailed tenrec (Microgale majori)
                  - Web-footed tenrec (Microgale mergulus)
                  - Montane shrew tenrec (Microgale monticola)
                  - Nasolo's shrew tenrec (Microgale nasoloi)
                  - Pygmy shrew tenrec (Microgale parvula)
                  - Greater long-tailed shrew tenrec (Microgale principula)
                  - Least shrew tenrec (Microgale pusilla)
                  - Shrew-toothed shrew tenrec (Microgale soricoides)
                  - Taiva shrew tenrec (Microgale taiva)
                  - Thomas's shrew tenrec (Microgale thomasi)
                - Subgenus Nesogale
                  - Dobson's shrew tenrec (Nesogale dobsoni)
                  - Talazac's shrew tenrec (Nesogale talazaci)
                - Genus Oryzorictes
                  - Mole-like rice tenrec (Oryzorictes hova)
                  - Four-toed rice tenrec (Oryzorictes tetradactylus)
              - Subfamily Tenrecinae (5 species)
                - Tribe Setiferini
                  - Genus Echinops
                    - Lesser hedgehog tenrec (Echinops telfairi)
                  - Genus Setifer
                    - Greater hedgehog tenrec (Setifer setosus)
                - Tribe Tenrecini
                  - Genus Hemicentetes
                    - Highland streaked tenrec (Hemicentetes nigriceps)
                    - Lowland streaked tenrec (Hemicentetes semispinosus)
                  - Genus Tenrec
                    - Common tenrec (Tenrec ecaudatus)
          - Suborder Chrysochloridea (golden moles)
            - Family Chrysochloridae (golden moles)
              - Subfamily Chrysochlorinae (11 species)
                - Genus Carpitalpa
                  - Arends' golden mole (Carpitalpa arendsi)
                - Genus Chlorotalpa
                  - Duthie's golden mole (Chlorotalpa duthieae)
                  - Sclater's golden mole (Chlorotalpa sclateri)
                - Genus Chrysochloris
                  - Subgenus Chrysochloris
                    - Cape golden mole (Chrysochloris asiatica)
                    - Visagie's golden mole (Chrysochloris visagiei)
                  - Subgenus Kilimatalpa
                    - Stuhlmann's golden mole (Chrysochloris stuhlmanni)
                - Genus Chrysospalax
                  - Giant golden mole (Chrysospalax trevelyani)
                  - Rough-haired golden mole (Chrysospalax villosus)
                - Genus Cryptochloris
                  - De Winton's golden mole (Cryptochloris wintoni)
                  - Van Zyl's golden mole (Cryptochloris zyli)
                - Genus Eremitalpa
                  - Grant's golden mole (Eremitalpa granti)
              - Subfamily Amblysominae (10 species)
                - Genus Amblysomus
                  - Fynbos golden mole (Amblysomus corriae)
                  - Hottentot golden mole (Amblysomus hottentotus)
                  - Marley's golden mole (Amblysomus marleyi)
                  - Robust golden mole (Amblysomus robustus)
                  - Highveld golden mole (Amblysomus septentrionalis)
                - Genus Calcochloris
                  - Subgenus Huetia
                    - Congo golden mole (Calcochloris leucorhinus)
                  - Subgenus Calcochloris
                    - Yellow golden mole (Calcochloris obtusirostris)
                  - Subgenus incertae sedis
                    - Somali golden mole (Calcochloris tytonis)
                - Genus Neamblysomus
                  - Juliana's golden mole (Neamblysomus julianae)
                  - Gunning's golden mole (Neamblysomus gunningi)

== See also ==
- Pseudoungulata
- List of mammals of Madagascar
- List of afrosoricids
