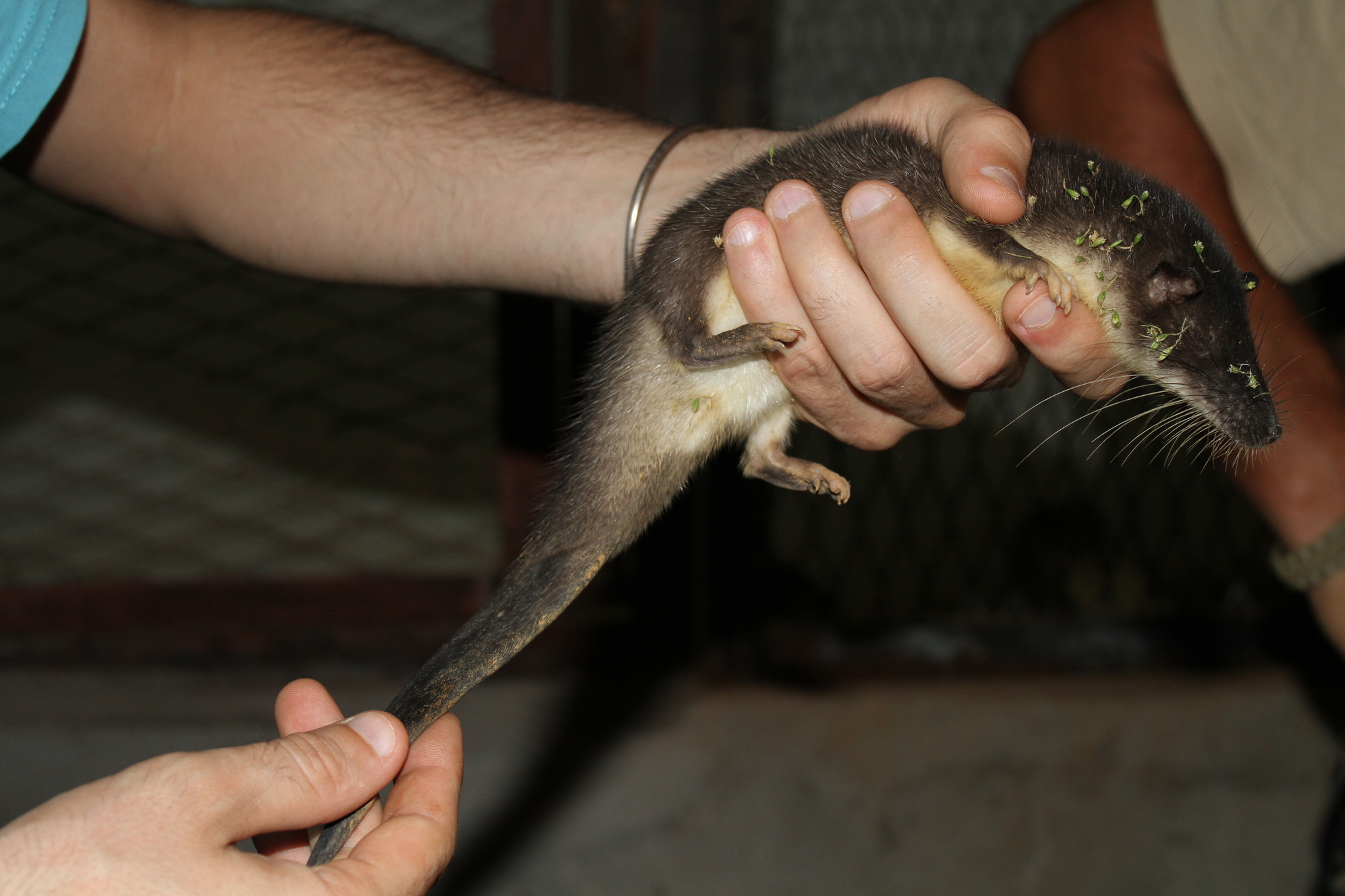
- Giant otter shrew (Potamogale velox)

Scientific classification
- Kingdom: Animalia
- Phylum: Chordata
- Class: Mammalia
- Order: Afrosoricida
- Suborder: Tenrecomorpha
- Family: Potamogalidae; Allmann, 1865

Type genus
- Potamogale Du Chaillu, 1860

Genera
- †Europotamogale; Micropotamogale; Potamogale
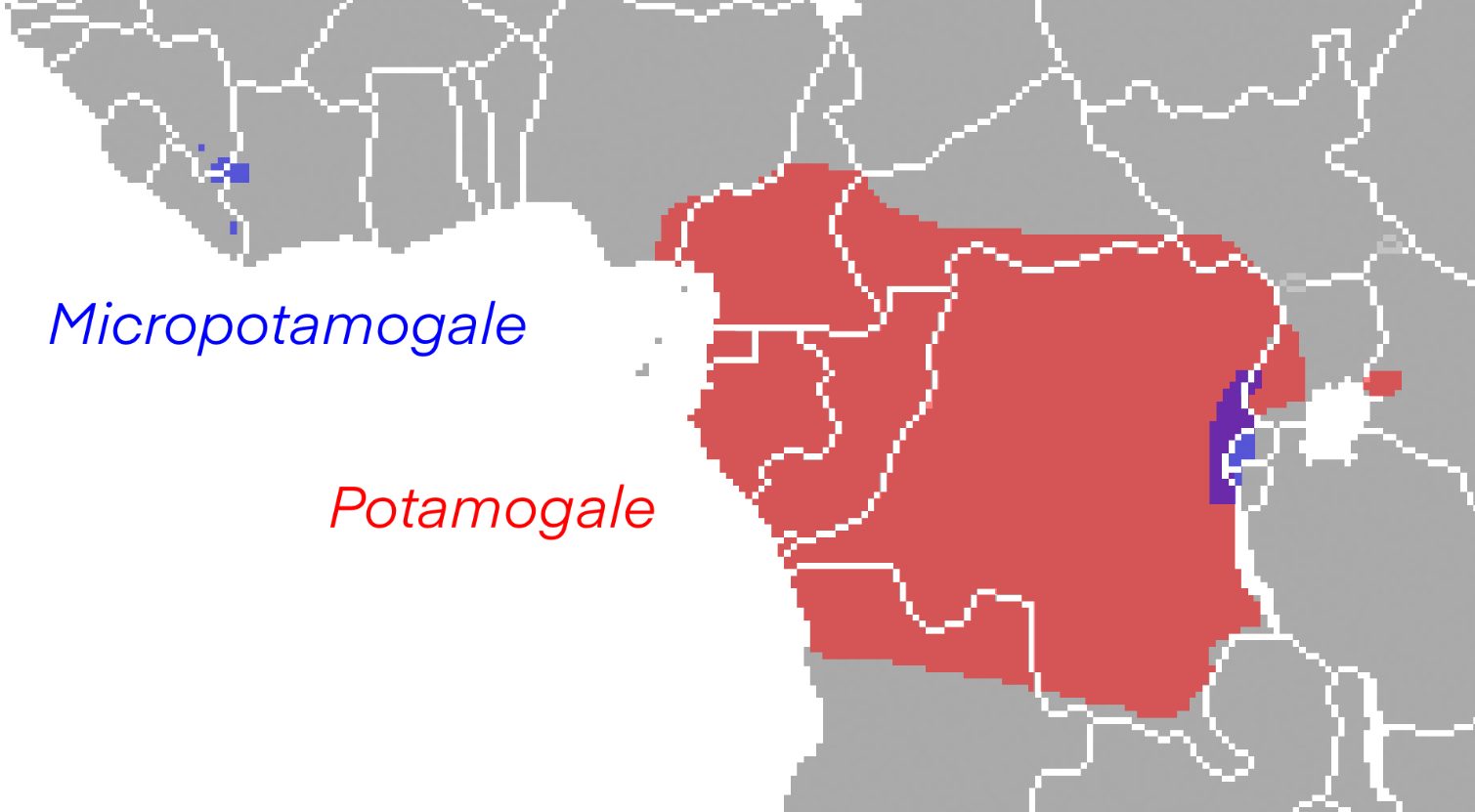

= Potamogalidae =

Family of mammals

Potamogalidae is the family of otter shrews, a group of semiaquatic riverine afrotherian mammals indigenous to sub-Saharan Africa. They are most closely related to the tenrecs of Madagascar, from which they are thought to have split about 47–53 million years ago. They were formerly considered a subfamily of Tenrecidae.

All otter shrews are carnivorous, preying on any aquatic animal they can find with their sensitive whiskers, particularly insects. As their common name suggests, they bear a strong, but superficial resemblance to true otters to which they are not closely related, nor are they closely related to true shrews. They move through the water by undulating their tail in a side-to-side motion similar to the motions made by a crocodile swimming.

== Morphology ==
Otter shrews have small eyes and ears and a broad, flat, muzzle that is covered with sensitive whiskers and ends in a leathery pad. The margins of the hind feet have fringes of skin, and the second and third toes are fused. All species of otter shrews have dense, water repellent fur.

== Extant species ==
Only three species of otter shrew are recognized. Of these, P. velox has a very broad geographic range, M. lamottei has a very restricted range, and M. ruwenzorii is intermediate.

Family Potamogalidae

- Genus Micropotamogale (dwarf otter shrews)
  - Nimba otter shrew (M. lamottei)
  - Ruwenzori otter shrew (M. ruwenzorii)
- Genus Potamogale
  - Giant otter shrew (P. velox)

== Phylogeny ==
Relations between the various afrotherian orders are still being studied. On the basis of molecular studies, elephants and sirenians appear to be sister groups. Potamogalids are sisters to tenrecids, and next most closely related to chrysochlorids. These findings are compatible with the work of earlier anatomists.

- Afrotheria
  - Afroinsectiphilia
    - Tubulidentata
      Orycteropodidae
    - Afroinsectivora
      - Macroscelidea
        Macroscelididae
      - Afrosoricida
        - Chrysochloridae
        - Tenrecomorpha
          - Potamogalidae
          - Tenrecidae
  - Paenungulata
    - Hyracoidea
      Procaviidae
    - Tethytheria
      - Proboscidea
        Elephantidae
      - Sirenia
        - Dugongidae
        - Trichechidae
