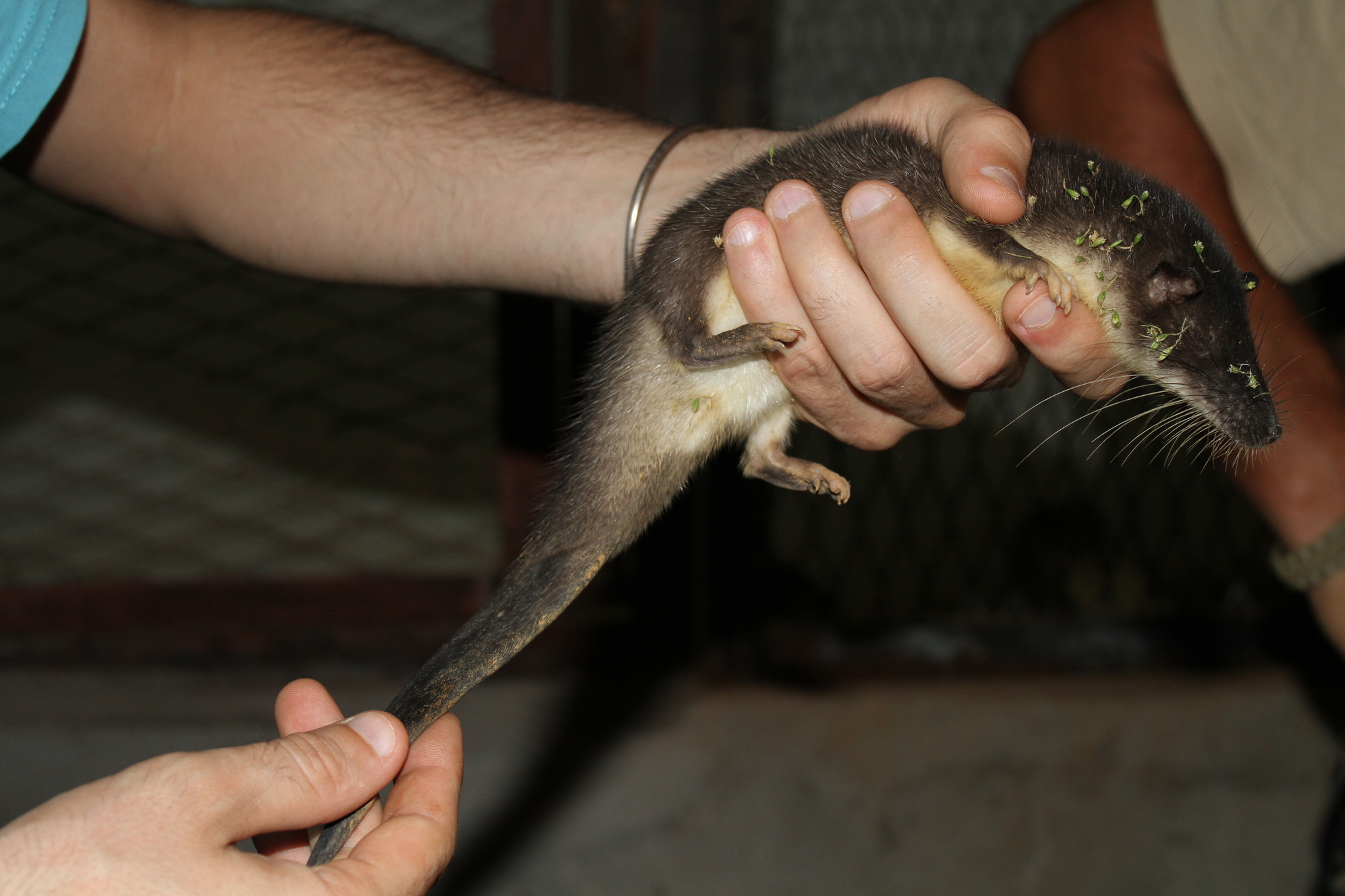

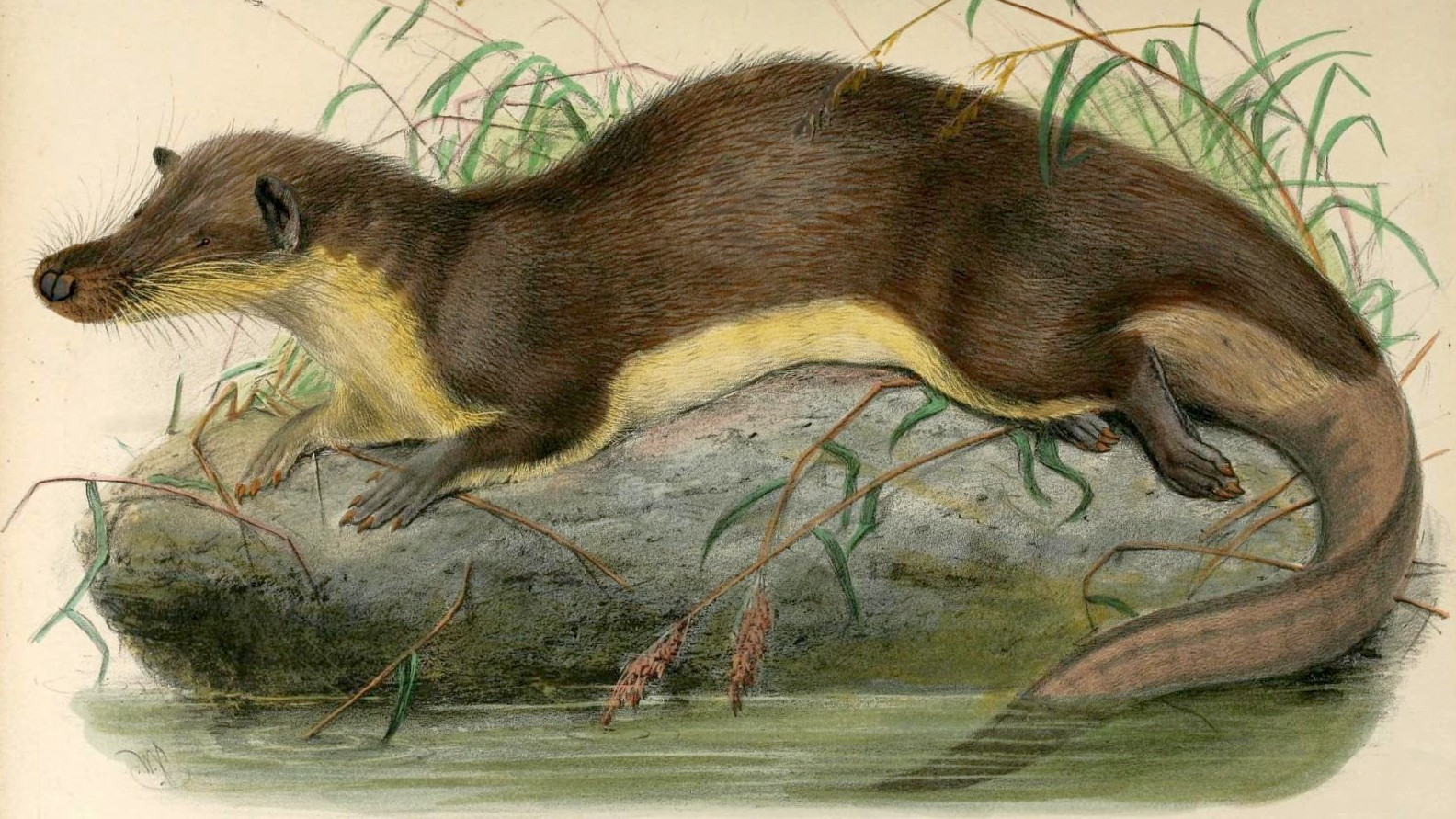

Conservation status
- Least Concern (IUCN 3.1)

Scientific classification
- Kingdom: Animalia
- Phylum: Chordata
- Class: Mammalia
- Order: Afrosoricida
- Suborder: Tenrecomorpha
- Family: Potamogalidae
- Genus: Potamogale; Du Chaillu, 1860
- Species: P. velox

Binomial name
- Potamogale velox (Du Chaillu, 1860)
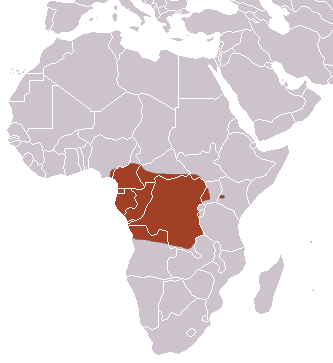
- Giant otter shrew range

= Giant otter shrew =

Species of mammal

The giant otter shrew (Potamogale velox) is a semiaquatic, carnivorous afrotherian mammal. It is found in the main rainforest block of central Africa from Nigeria to Zambia, with a few isolated populations in Kenya and Uganda. It lives in streams, wetlands and slow flowing larger rivers. It is the only species in the genus Potamogale. Otter shrews are most closely related to the tenrecs of Madagascar.

They are nocturnal carnivores that feed on aquatic animals. Despite its name, the giant otter shrew is neither a true shrew (Soricidae) or otter (Lutrinae). The common name refers to their resemblance to otters with their flat face, stiff whiskers, and muscular tails, and to their overall superficial similarity to true shrews.

== Description ==
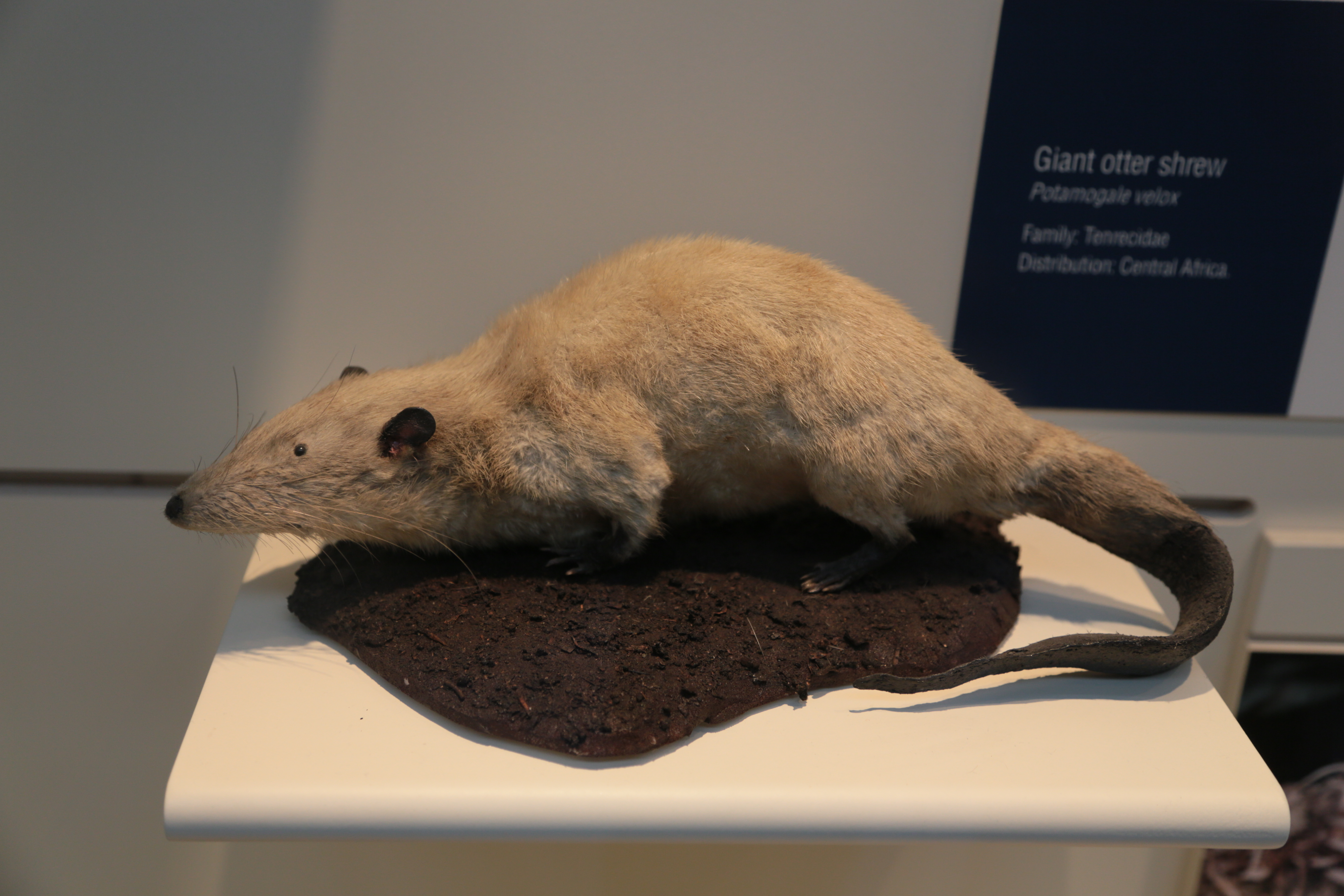
Taxidermied giant otter shrew

The giant otter shrew is a mammal superficially similar to an otter in appearance. It is characterized by a long, flat tail, which it uses for swimming by sideways undulation like a fish. It has a muzzle covered with bristles, and flat shielded nostrils. It has dense, soft hair, silky on the tail.

It has small eyes and external ears. Its fur consists of a dense undercoat and coarse guard hairs. It possesses counter-shading with dark brown on its back and whitish or yellowish under parts. The tail is covered with a short, silky coat of fur and is compressed laterally which allow it to swim by horizontal undulations as in fishes and crocodiles. Its legs are short and lack webbing so they are not used for swimming. The hind feet have a flap of skin along the inside that allows them to be held snugly against the body when swimming. There are also two syndactylous (2nd and 3rd toes are fused) toes on the hind feet, used for grooming. On land P. velox is plantigrade. Females have two mammae on the lower abdomen for feeding young.

The mass ranges from 300 grams (11 oz) to 950 grams (34 oz). Head and body length is 290 millimetres (11 in) to 350 millimetres (14 in), and reaches 535 millimetres (21.1 in) to 640 millimetres (25 in) with tail.

== Geographic range ==
Giant otter shrews are native to central Africa, from the southern regions of Nigeria (central Rainforest Zone), and then eastward through Equatorial Guinea, Gabon, and the Central African Republic, Chad, the Republic of Congo, the Democratic Republic of the Congo, South Sudan to the northern regions of Angola and Zambia. There is a small population that lives between Uganda and Kenya and the preserved rainforest of Kakamega, Kenya.

== Habitat ==
This species prefers fresh water aquatic microhabitats in the rainforest. Preferred environments include fast flowing rivers, streams, swamps, coastal rivers, and during rainy season some may retreat to small forest pools (altitude range from 0–1,800m). River banks provide good habitats for breeding and nesting. These animals make burrows with an entrance below water level (like otters) and during the day find shelter there and then become active in the afternoon.

== Behavior ==
The giant otter shrew builds burrows among riverbank crevices. It chooses dry leaves with which to line its nest. This is also where breeding takes place. The burrows are frequently changed. When foraging, otter shrews take frequent grooming breaks. When traveling upstream the otter shrew travels on the bank and then swims downstream. The night foraging routine is regular and predictable, and covers up to 800 meters a night. P. velox regularly visits discrete piles of feces that are sheltered and probably used to mark boundaries of territory.

Giant otter shrews are solitary with one shrew occupying between 500 and 1,000 m of stream.

== Food habits ==
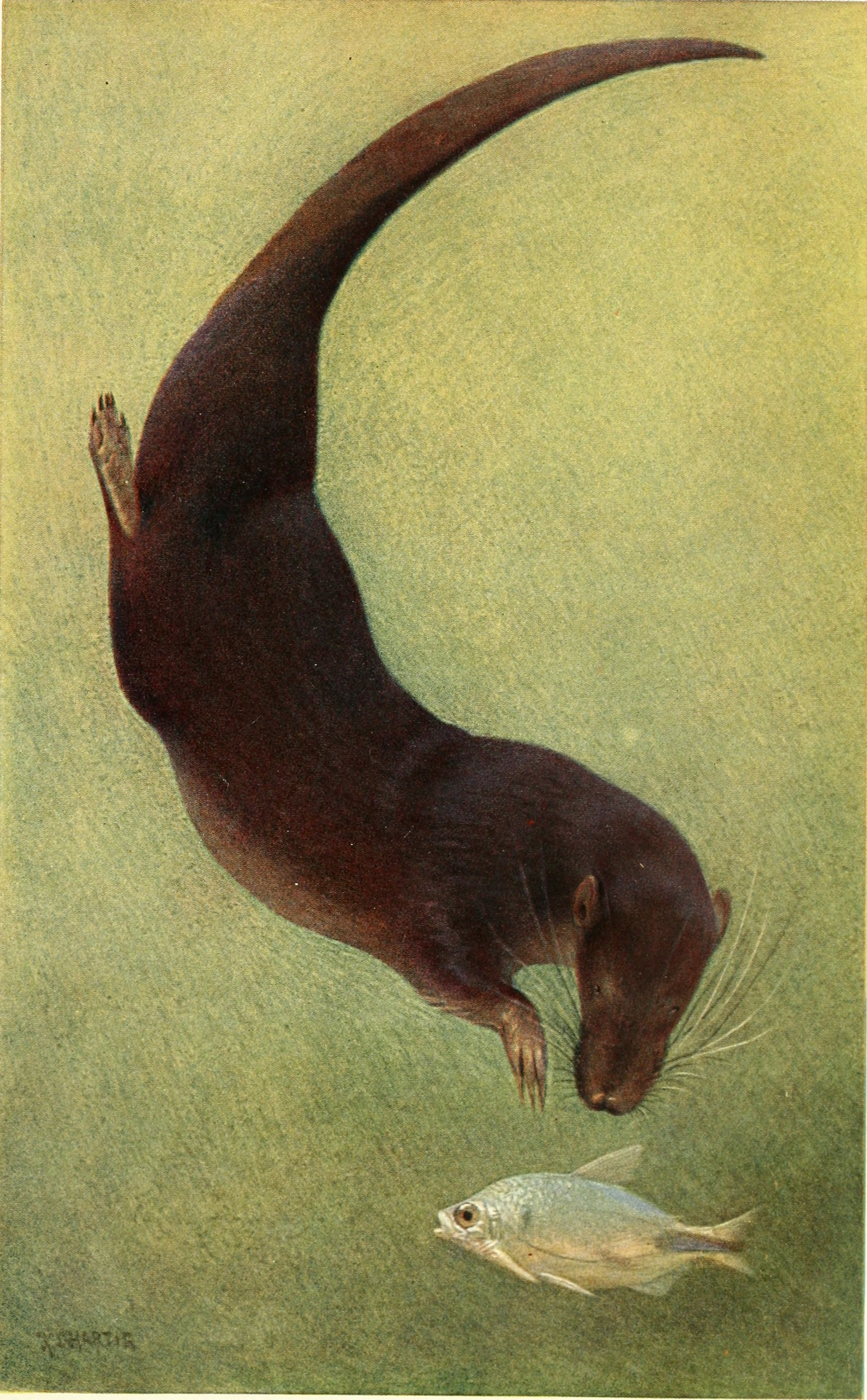
Illustration of giant otter shrew hunting fish

P. velox is a nocturnal predator, hunting primarily by touch and scent in and around calm pools. Each dive lasts only seconds. P. velox searches both within the pool and along the bank for prey using the sensitive vibrissae and odor and apparently not eyesight. It prefers areas that have cover to retreat to when it feels threatened. P. velox attacks prey using sharp bites, sometimes pinning the prey with its fore feet, and flipping crabs over to attack their weaker ventral surface. They usually avoid crabs larger than 7 cm across. The prey preference varies among individuals; some prefer crabs; others, frogs or fish. Frogs are eaten headfirst and fish are pulled apart into manageable bits. Prey is consumed on the bank. P. velox also eats insects, mollusks, and freshwater prawns. In captivity it eats 15–20 crabs per night.

== Lifespan ==
Giant otter shrews fare very poorly in captivity. Captive specimens have been recorded to deteriorate in health very quickly, living only 1–14 days.

== Reproduction ==
Giant otter shrews breed during the wet/rainy season. They give birth to one or two young per litter, once or twice a year. Males move long distances via water in search of mates and it is thought that males rut (or fight) during the wet season.

== Conservation status ==
Currently this species is listed as being of least concern by the IUCN because its declining rate is not significant enough to move to the next category. However it is on the decline. One of the major threats to this species is the soil erosion caused by deforestation especially in Cameroon. While they can tolerate seasonally cloudy streams, streams muddied from erosion and deforestation are little used. Some drown in fishing nets or fish traps, and members of this species have not survived well in captivity. There is ongoing research about the effects of human activity on them. It is also hunted extensively for its skin.
