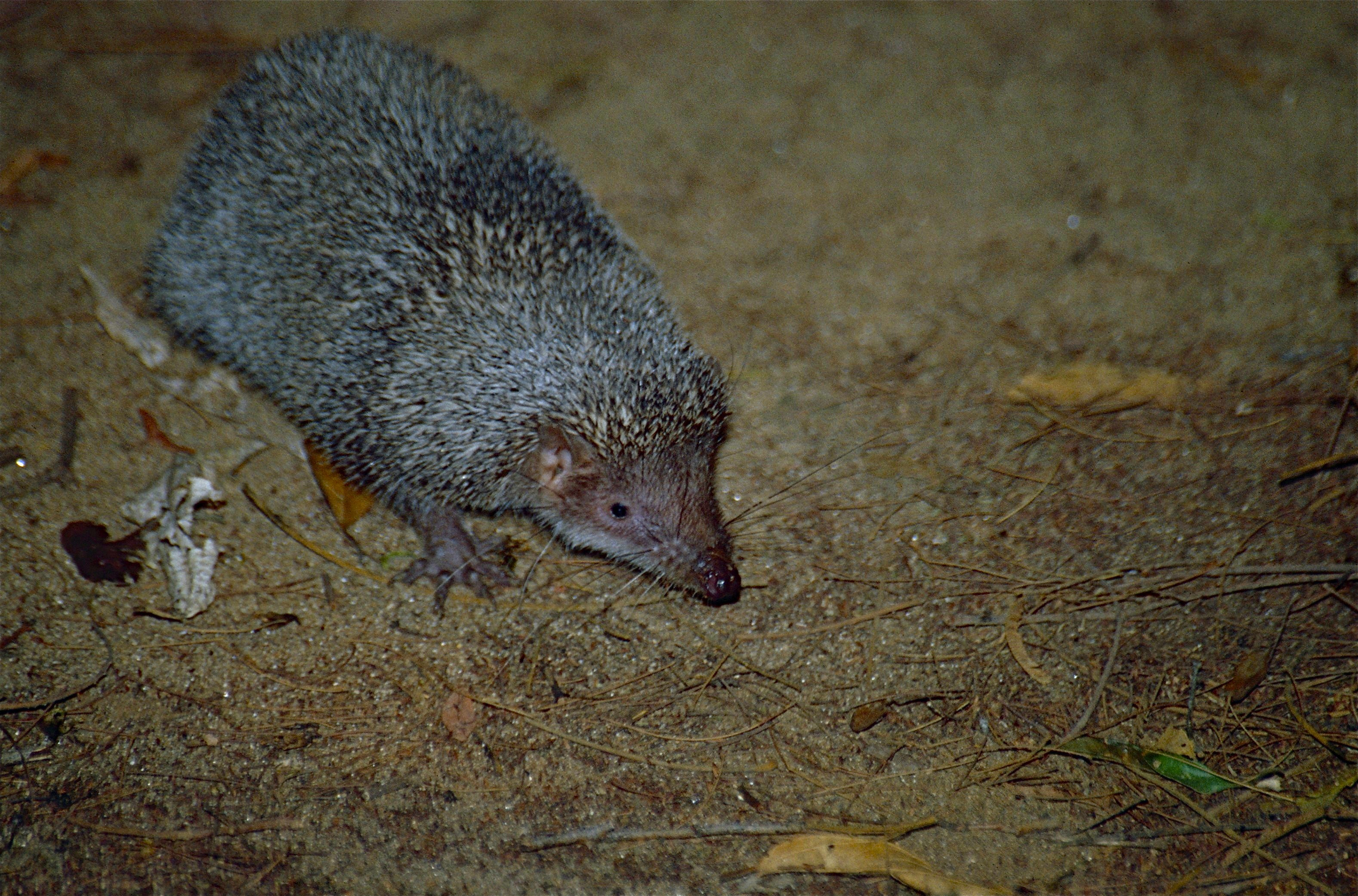

Conservation status
- Least Concern (IUCN 3.1)

Scientific classification
- Kingdom: Animalia
- Phylum: Chordata
- Class: Mammalia
- Order: Afrosoricida
- Suborder: Tenrecomorpha
- Family: Tenrecidae
- Genus: Setifer; Froriep, 1806
- Species: S. setosus

Binomial name
- Setifer setosus (Schreber, 1778)
- Greater hedgehog tenrec range

Synonyms
- Dasogale fontoynonti Grandidier, 1929 (protonym)

= Greater hedgehog tenrec =

Species of mammal

The greater hedgehog tenrec (Setifer setosus), also known as the large Madagascar hedgehog or sokina, is a species of mammal in the family Tenrecidae. It is endemic to Madagascar. Its natural habitats are subtropical or tropical forests, shrubland and grassland, savanna, rural gardens, and urban areas.

It is the only species in the genus Setifer. Despite the close resemblance, it is not closely related to hedgehogs. Similarly to hedgehogs, neoplasia is common within the species and plays a significant role in morbidity and mortality.

== Distribution and habitat ==
Greater hedgehog tenrecs are found throughout the island of Madagascar and are endemic to this island.

The island of Madagascar ranges from sea level to 2,250 meters above sea level, and Setifer setosus is found throughout the island, with the exception of wetlands and marshes. Greater hedgehog tenrecs are seen in urban areas and even in areas with extensive human disturbance. The prime habitat for greater hedgehog tenrecs are the eastern forests and lower elevations because of their eating habits, but they are found in wet and dry areas.

Greater hedgehog tenrecs are omnivores. They eat insects, grubs, and other invertebrates, as well as fruits, and will scavenge. They forage at ground level, although they are also known to climb.
