= Paulina D. Jenkins =

British mammalogist

Paulina (Paula) D. Jenkins – active from the 1970s – is a British zoologist, specialising in mammals and employed as curator at the Natural History Museum, London. Jenkins has published research in a large number of papers, especially on smaller mammals such as shrews and bats. Her honours include the specific epithet derived from her first name for a species of rock rat found in Laos, Saxatilomys paulinae, prompting the invention of a common name "Paulina's rock rat". The mammalogist's surname is also the eponym of other animal names, the shrew-tenrec Microgale jenkinsae, and derived in the masculine gender for the shrew Crocidura jenkinsi.
