= Charles Immanuel Forsyth Major =

Swiss physician, zoologist and vertebrate palaeontologist

Charles Immanuel Forsyth Major (15 August 1843 in Glasgow – 25 March 1923 in Munich) was a Scottish-born, Swiss physician, zoologist, and vertebrate palaeontologist.

Major was born in Glasgow and studied at Basel and Zurich Universities in Switzerland and later Göttingen in Germany. He graduated in medicine at Basel in 1868 and became a physician in Florence, Italy.

Like many early naturalists, he spent his free time studying fossil mammals. His first publication was on fossil primates in 1872. The Italian government supported him in 1877; he collected fossils from Calabria, Corsica, Sardinia, and Sicily. In 1886, he stopped practising as a physician and began to study fossils in the Greek Archipelago with his collections going to the College Galliard at Lausanne and to the British Museum (Natural History). In the British Museum collections he took a keen interest in material from Madagascar. He studied the lemur fauna, both extant and extinct, discovered the new family Megaladapidae (Major 1893), genus and species of the extinct giant lemur Megaladapis madagascariensis (Major 1893), and five new species in the genera Lepilemur and Cheirogaleus. This led to a keen interest in Madagascar and initiated an expedition to it. His field trip was funded by The Royal Society along with funds from Lionel Walter Rothschild, F. DuCane Godman, Sir Henry Peek and himself. The expedition started from Britain on 15 July 1894 and returned on 30 August 1896. In the two years they amassed large collections which arrived in 73 crates.

== See also ==
- Category:Taxa named by Charles Immanuel Forsyth Major
