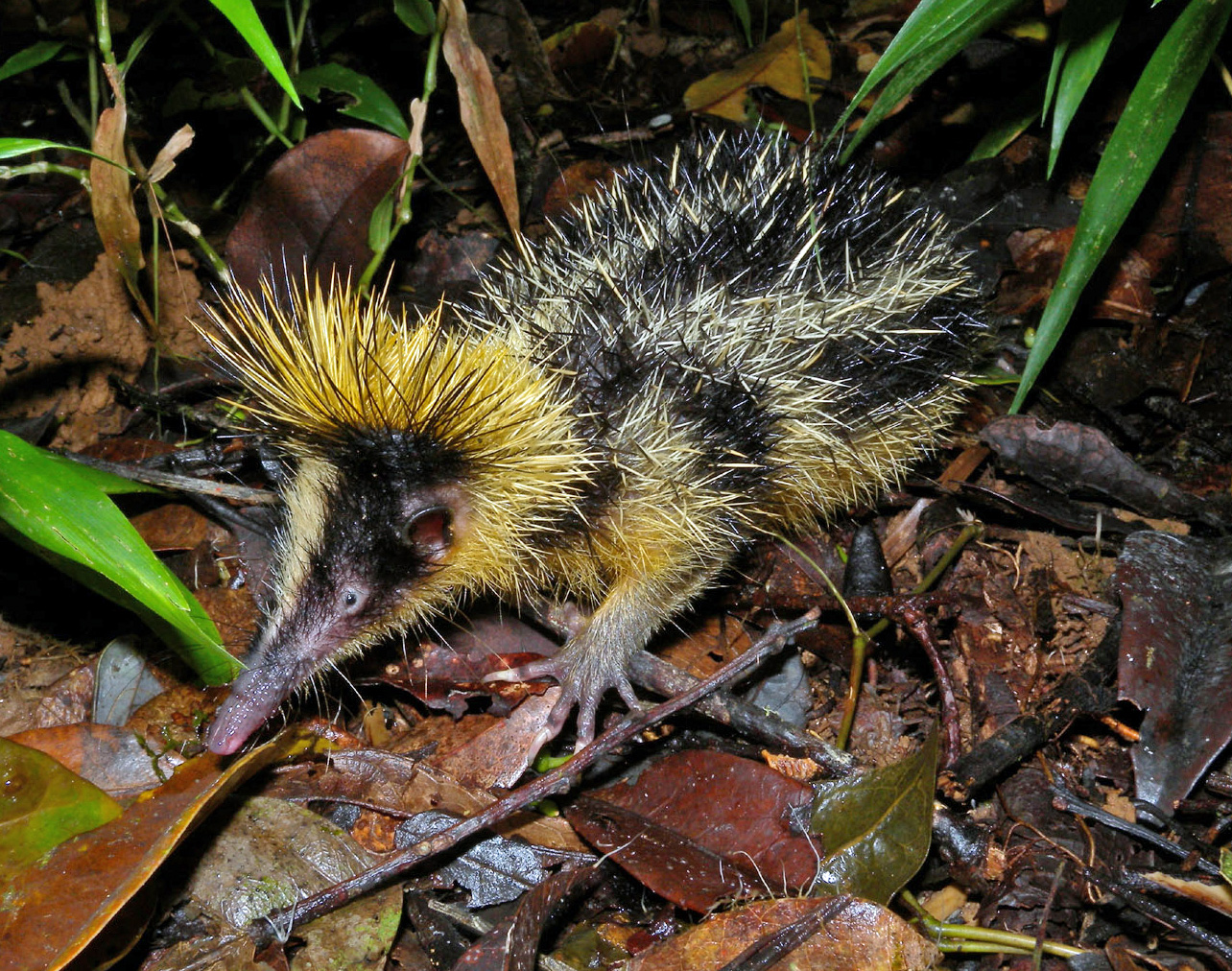
- Lowland streaked tenrec (Hemicentetes semispinosus)
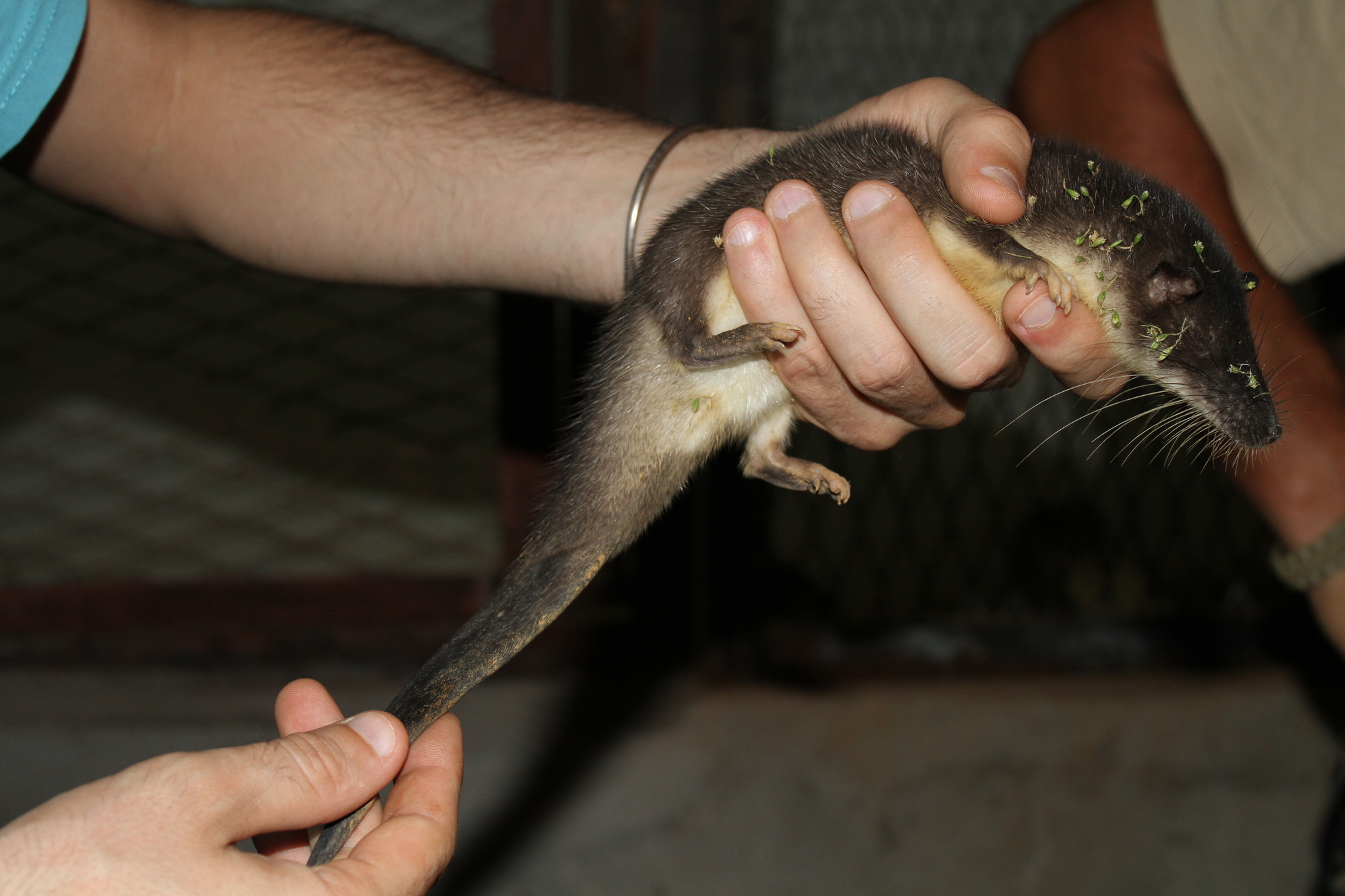
- Giant otter shrew (Potamogale velox)

Scientific classification
- Kingdom: Animalia
- Phylum: Chordata
- Class: Mammalia
- Order: Afrosoricida
- Suborder: Tenrecomorpha; Butler, 1972

Families
- †Nanogale; Potamogalidae; †Plesiorycteropus; Tenrecidae
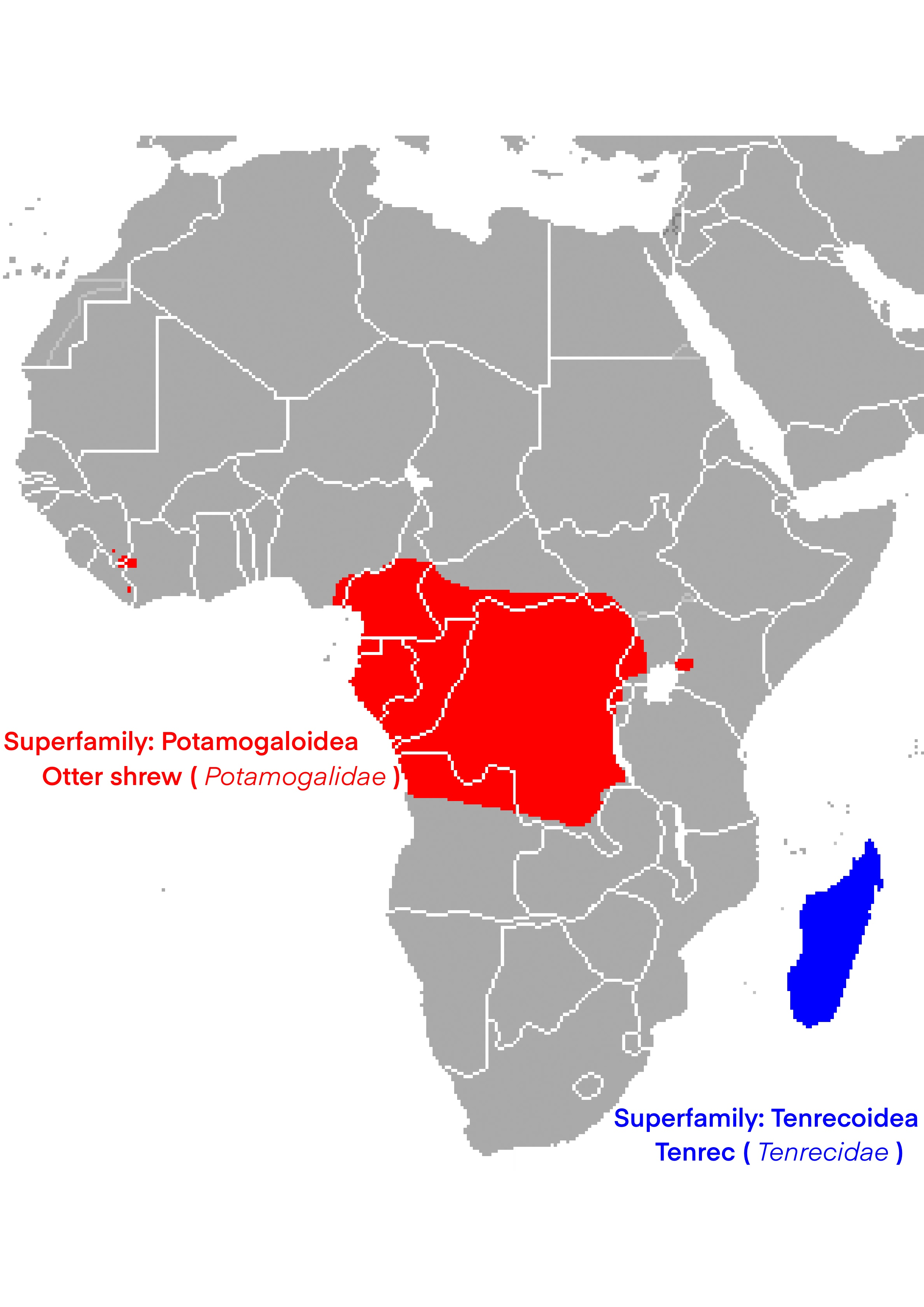

= Tenrecomorpha =

Suborder of mammals

Tenrecomorpha is the suborder of otter shrews and tenrecs, a group of afrotherian mammals indigenous to equatorial Africa and Madagascar, respectively. The two families are thought to have split about 47–53 million years ago. Potamogalid otter shrews were formerly considered a subfamily of Tenrecidae. The suborder is also presumed to contain the extinct genus Plesiorycteropus, a group of possibly fossorial insectivores similar to aardvarks, which is known to be more closely related to tenrecs of subfamily Tenrecinae than to golden moles of suborder Chrysochloridea.

Otter shrews are carnivorous and semiaquatic, preying on any aquatic animal they can find with their sensitive whiskers. All tenrecs are believed to descend from a common ancestor that lived 29–37 million years (Ma) ago after rafting from Africa to Madagascar in a single event. Tenrecs are widely diverse; as a result of convergent evolution they resemble hedgehogs, shrews, opossums or mice. All tenrecs appear to be at least somewhat omnivorous, with invertebrates forming the largest part of their diets.
