= List of afrosoricids =

Species in mammal order Afrosoricida

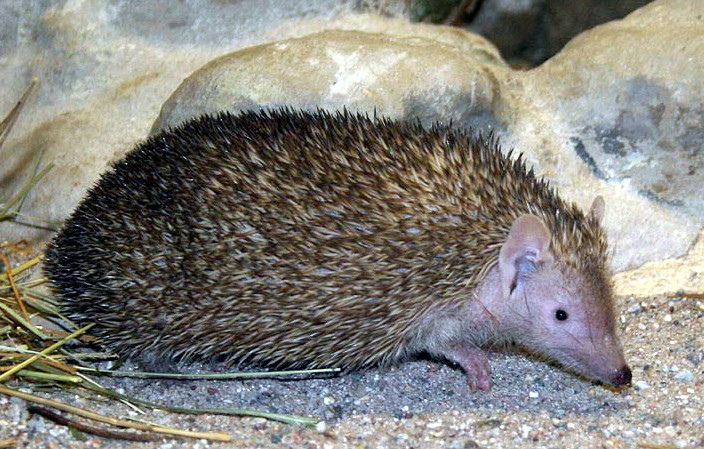
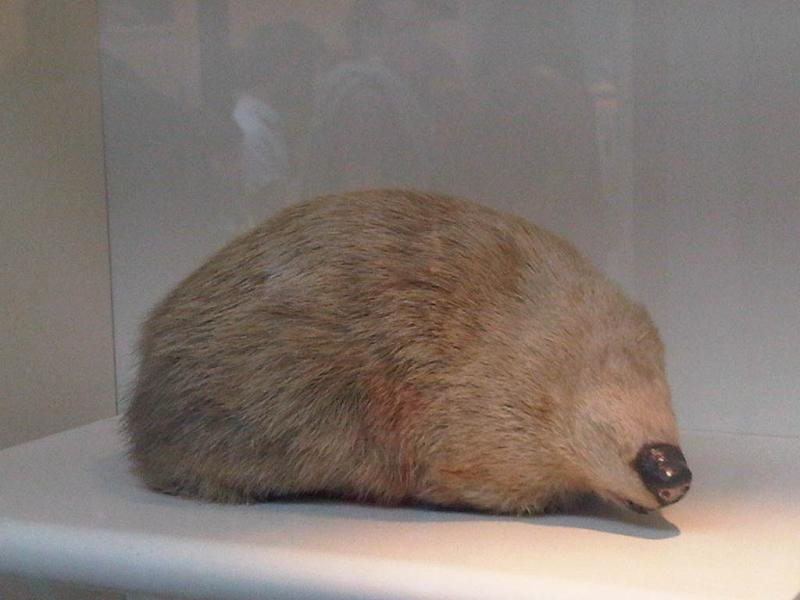
Lesser hedgehog tenrec (Echinops telfairi) and giant golden mole (Chrysospalax trevelyani )

Afrosoricida is an order of placental mammals. Members of this order are called afrosoricids, and include golden moles, otter shrews, and tenrecs. They are found in Africa, generally in forests, but also inland wetlands, shrublands, and grasslands. They range in size from the least shrew tenrec, at 4 cm (2 in) plus a 6 cm (2 in) tail, to the giant otter shrew, at 34 cm (13 in) plus a 39 cm (15 in) tail. Afrosoricids primarily eat invertebrates, particularly insects and earthworms, though some will also eat small lizards or other vertebrates. The golden moles have vestigial eyes covered with skin, and track their prey through vibrations rather than sight. No population estimates have been made for any afrosoricid species, though the De Winton's golden mole is classified as Critically Endangered and the giant golden mole, Gunning's golden mole, Jenkins's shrew tenrec, Juliana's golden mole, Marley's golden mole, northern shrew tenrec, and Van Zyl's golden mole are categorized as endangered species.

The fifty-five extant species of Afrosoricida are divided into two suborders, with Chrysochloridea containing the family Chrysochloridae, or golden moles, and Tenrecomorpha containing the families Potamogalidae, or otter shrews, and Tenrecidae, or tenrecs. Chrysochloridae is split into the subfamilies Chrysochlorinae, containing eleven species in six genera, and Amblysominae, containing ten species in four genera. Potamogalidae consists of three species in two genera, while Tenrecidae contains the subfamilies of Geogalinae, comprising a single species, Oryzorictinae, containing twenty-five species in three genera, and Tenrecinae, containing five species in four genera. The order as a whole was traditionally grouped with the hedgehogs, shrews, and moles as part of the order Lipotyphla, but modern molecular phylogenetic analysis resulted in that order being split into Afrosoricida and Eulipotyphla. Few extinct Afrosoricida species have been discovered, though due to ongoing research and discoveries the exact number and categorization are not fixed.

== Conventions ==
IUCN Red List categories
Conservation status
- EX: Extinct (0 species)
- EW: Extinct in the wild (0 species)
- CR: Critically endangered (1 species)
- EN: Endangered (7 species)
- VU: Vulnerable (9 species)
- NT: Near threatened (2 species)
- LC: Least concern (32 species)

Other categories
- DD: Data deficient (4 species)
- NE: Not evaluated (0 species)

The author citation for the species or genus is given after the scientific name; parentheses around the author citation indicate that this was not the original taxonomic placement. Conservation status codes listed follow the International Union for Conservation of Nature (IUCN) Red List of Threatened Species. Range maps are provided wherever possible; if a range map is not available, a description of the afrosoricid's range is provided. Ranges are based on the IUCN Red List for that species unless otherwise noted. All extinct species or subspecies listed alongside extant species went extinct after 1500 CE, and are indicated by a dagger symbol "†".

== Classification ==
The order Afrosoricida consists of two suborders, Chrysochloridea and Tenrecomorpha. Chrysochloridea consists of the family Chrysochloridae, or golden moles, and Tenrecomorpha contains the families Potamogalidae, or otter shrews, and Tenrecidae, or tenrecs. Chrysochloridae contains twenty-one species in ten genera, divided into two subfamilies. Potamogalidae consists of three species in two genera, while Tenrecidae contains thirty-one species in eight genera, divided into three subfamilies. Many of these species are further subdivided into subspecies. This does not include hybrid species or extinct prehistoric species.

Suborder Chrysochloridea

- Family Chrysochloridae
  - Subfamily Chrysochlorinae
    - Genus Carpitalpa (Arends' golden mole): one species
    - Genus Chlorotalpa (golden moles): two species
    - Genus Chrysochloris (golden moles): three species
    - Genus Chrysospalax (golden moles): two species
    - Genus Cryptochloris (golden moles): two species
    - Genus Eremitalpa (Grant's golden mole): one species
  - Subfamily Amblysominae
    - Genus Amblysomus (narrow-headed golden moles): five species
    - Genus Calcochloris (yellow golden mole): one species
    - Genus Huetia (Central African golden moles): two species
    - Genus Neamblysomus (golden moles): two species

Suborder Tenrecomorpha

- Family Potamogalidae
  - Genus Micropotamogale (dwarf otter shrews): two species
  - Genus Potamogale (giant otter shrew): one species
- Family Tenrecidae
  - Subfamily Geogalinae
    - Genus Geogale (large-eared tenrec): one species
  - Subfamily Oryzorictinae
    - Genus Microgale (shrew tenrecs): twenty-one species
    - Genus Nesogale (shrew tenrecs): two species
    - Genus Oryzorictes (rice tenrecs): two species
  - Subfamily Tenrecinae
    - Genus Echinops (lesser hedgehog tenrec): one species
    - Genus Hemicentetes (streaked tenrecs): two species
    - Genus Setifer (greater hedgehog tenrec): one species
    - Genus Tenrec (tailless tenrec): one species

- Afrosoricida
  - Chrysochloridea
    - Chrysochloridae
      - Eremitalpa
      - - - Chrysochloris
          - Cryptochloris
          - Huetia
        - - - Chrysospalax
            - Calcochloris
          - - Chlorotalpa
            - - Amblysomus
              - - Carpitalpa
                - Neamblysomus
  - Tenrecomorpha
    - Potamogalidae
      - Micropotamogale
      - Potamogale
    - Tenrecidae
      - - - Hemicentetes
          - Tenrec
        - - Echinops
          - Setifer
      - - - Geogale
          - Oryzorictes
        - - Microgale
          - Nesogale

== Afrosoricids ==
The following classification is based on the taxonomy described by the reference work Mammal Species of the World (2005), with augmentation by generally accepted proposals made since using molecular phylogenetic analysis, as supported by both the IUCN and the American Society of Mammalogists.

=== Suborder Chrysochloridea ===
==== Family Chrysochloridae ====
===== Subfamily Chrysochlorinae =====
Genus Carpitalpa – Lundholm, 1955 – one species
Common name	Scientific name and subspecies	Range	Size and ecology	IUCN status and estimated population
Arends's golden mole	C. arendsi (Lundholm, 1955)	Mozambique and Zimbabwe	Size: 11–14 cm (4–6 in) long Habitat: Forest and grassland Diet: Insects and earthworms	VU Unknown

Genus Chlorotalpa – Roberts, 1924 – two species
Common name	Scientific name and subspecies	Range	Size and ecology	IUCN status and estimated population
Duthie's golden mole	C. duthieae (Broom, 1907)	Southern South Africa	Size: 9–13 cm (4–5 in) long Habitat: Forest, savanna, and grassland Diet: Earthworms	VU Unknown
Sclater's golden mole	C. sclateri (Broom, 1907) Four subspecies: C. s. guillarmodi; C. s. montana; C. s. sclateri; C. s. shortridgei	South Africa and Lesotho	Size: 8–14 cm (3–6 in) long Habitat: Shrubland and grassland Diet: Eathworms and insect larvae	LC Unknown

Genus Chrysochloris – Lacépède, 1799 – three species
Common name	Scientific name and subspecies	Range	Size and ecology	IUCN status and estimated population
Cape golden mole	C. asiatica (Linnaeus, 1758)	Western South Africa	Size: 9–12 cm (4–5 in) long Habitat: Forest, shrubland, and grassland Diet: Insects and small invertebrates, as well as small lizards	LC Unknown
Stuhlmann's golden mole	C. stuhlmanni Matschie, 1894 Three subspecies: C. s. balsaci; C. s. stuhlmanni; C. s. stuhlmanni	Scattered central Africa	Size: 10–13 cm (4–5 in) long Habitat: Forest, shrubland, and grassland Diet: Earthworms and insect larvae, as well as other invertebrates	LC Unknown
Visagie's golden mole	C. visagiei Broom, 1950	Western South Africa	Size: About 10 cm (4 in) long Habitat: Shrubland Diet: Unknown	DD Unknown

Genus Chrysospalax – Gill, 1883 – two species
Common name	Scientific name and subspecies	Range	Size and ecology	IUCN status and estimated population
Giant golden mole	C. trevelyani (Günther, 1875)	Southern South Africa	Size: 20–24 cm (8–9 in) long Habitat: Forest and grassland Diet: Small invertebrates, especially giant earthworms and millipedes, as well as small vertebrates	EN Unknown
Rough-haired golden mole	C. villosus (Smith, 1833) Six subspecies: C. v. dobsoni; C. v. leschae; C. v. rufopallidus; C. v. rufus; C. v. transvaalensis; C. v. villosus	South Africa	Size: 12–18 cm (5–7 in) long Habitat: Shrubland and grassland Diet: Small invertebrates, especially termites and earthworms	VU Unknown

Genus Cryptochloris – Shortridge, Carter, 1938 – two species
Common name	Scientific name and subspecies	Range	Size and ecology	IUCN status and estimated population
De Winton's golden mole	C. wintoni (Broom, 1907)	Western South Africa	Size: 8–10 cm (3–4 in) long Habitat: Shrubland Diet: Unknown	CR Unknown
Van Zyl's golden mole	C. zyli Shortridge, Carter, 1938	Western South Africa	Size: About 8 cm (3 in) long Habitat: Shrubland Diet: Unknown	EN Unknown

Genus Eremitalpa – Roberts, 1924 – one species
Common name	Scientific name and subspecies	Range	Size and ecology	IUCN status and estimated population
Grant's golden mole	E. granti (Broom, 1907) Two subspecies: E. g. granti; E. g. namibensis	Western South Africa and Namibia	Size: 7–9 cm (3–4 in) long Habitat: Shrubland and desert Diet: Termites and other insects, as well as roots and small lizards	LC Unknown

===== Subfamily Amblysominae =====
Genus Amblysomus – Pomel, 1848 – five species
Common name	Scientific name and subspecies	Range	Size and ecology	IUCN status and estimated population
Fynbos golden mole	A. corriae Thomas, 1905 Two subspecies: A. c. corriae; A. c. devilliersi	Southern South Africa	Size: 10–13 cm (4–5 in) long Habitat: Forest, savanna, shrubland, and grassland Diet: Insects	NT Unknown
Highveld golden mole	A. septentrionalis Roberts, 1913	Eastern South Africa	Size: 10–15 cm (4–6 in) long Habitat: Forest, savanna, shrubland, and grassland Diet: Earthworms and other invertebrates	NT Unknown
Hottentot golden mole	A. hottentotus (Smith, 1829) Five subspecies: A. h. hottentotus; A. h. iris (Zulu golden mole); A. h. longiceps; A. h. meesteri; A. h. pondoliae	South Africa	Size: 10–14 cm (4–6 in) long Habitat: Forest, savanna, shrubland, and grassland Diet: Earthworms and other invertebrates	LC Unknown
Marley's golden mole	A. marleyi Roberts, 1931	Eastern South Africa	Size: 9–12 cm (4–5 in) long Habitat: Forest, savanna, shrubland, and grassland Diet: Insects	EN Unknown
Robust golden mole	A. robustus Bronner, 2000	Eastern South Africa	Size: 10–15 cm (4–6 in) long Habitat: Shrubland and grassland Diet: Small insects and earthworms	VU Unknown

Genus Calcochloris – Mivart, 1867 – one species
Common name	Scientific name and subspecies	Range	Size and ecology	IUCN status and estimated population
Yellow golden mole	C. obtusirostris (Peters, 1851) Three subspecies: C. o. chrysillus; C. o. limpopoensis; C. o. obtusirostris	Mozambique, South Africa, and Zimbabwe	Size: 8–11 cm (3–4 in) long Habitat: Forest and savanna Diet: Insects as well as small lizards	LC Unknown

Genus Huetia – Forcart, 1942 – two species
Common name	Scientific name and subspecies	Range	Size and ecology	IUCN status and estimated population
Congo golden mole	H. leucorhinus (Huet, 1885) Two subspecies: H. l. cahni; H. l. leucorhinus	Western Central Africa	Size: 8–10 cm (3–4 in) long Habitat: Forest Diet: Earthworms and other invertebrates	DD Unknown
Somali golden mole	H. tytonis (Simonetta, 1968)	Somalia	Size: Unknown Habitat: Savanna Diet: Unknown	DD Unknown

Genus Neamblysomus – Roberts, 1924 – two species
Common name	Scientific name and subspecies	Range	Size and ecology	IUCN status and estimated population
Gunning's golden mole	N. gunningi (Broom, 1908)	Northern South Africa	Size: 11–14 cm (4–6 in) long Habitat: Forest, shrubland, and grassland Diet: Earthworms	EN Unknown
Juliana's golden mole	N. julianae (Meester, 1972)	Northern South Africa	Size: 9–11 cm (4 in) long Habitat: Savanna and grassland Diet: Earthworms and insects	EN Unknown

=== Suborder Tenrecomorpha ===
==== Family Potamogalidae ====
Genus Micropotamogale – Heim de Balsac, 1954 – two species
Common name	Scientific name and subspecies	Range	Size and ecology	IUCN status and estimated population
Nimba otter shrew	M. lamottei Heim de Balsac, 1954	Mount Richard-Molard area in western Africa	Size: 12–16 cm (5–6 in) long, plus 9–14 cm (4–6 in) tail Habitat: Forest and inland wetlands Diet: Crabs and catfish, as well as insects and tadpoles	VU Unknown
Ruwenzori otter shrew	M. ruwenzorii (de Witte, Frechkop, 1955)	Central Africa	Size: 12–20 cm (5–8 in) long, plus 10–15 cm (4–6 in) tail Habitat: Forest and inland wetlands Diet: Insect larvae and worms, as well as small fish, frogs, and crabs	LC Unknown

Genus Potamogale – Du Chaillu, 1860 – one species
Common name	Scientific name and subspecies	Range	Size and ecology	IUCN status and estimated population
Giant otter shrew	P. velox (Du Chaillu, 1860)	Central Africa	Size: 30–34 cm (12–13 in) long, plus 23–29 cm (9–11 in) tail Habitat: Forest and inland wetlands Diet: Fishes, crabs, shrimps, and water insects, as well as frogs	LC Unknown

==== Family Tenrecidae ====
===== Subfamily Geogalinae =====
Genus Geogale – Milne-Edwards, Grandidier, 1872 – one species
Common name	Scientific name and subspecies	Range	Size and ecology	IUCN status and estimated population
Large-eared tenrec	G. aurita Milne-Edwards, Grandidier, 1872 Two subspecies: G. a. aurita; G. a. orientalis	Scattered Madagascar	Size: 6–8 cm (2–3 in) long, plus 3–4 cm (1–2 in) tail Habitat: Forest and shrubland Diet: Ants, termites, and other invertebrates	LC Unknown

===== Subfamily Oryzorictinae =====
Genus Microgale – Thomas, 1882 – twenty-one species
Common name	Scientific name and subspecies	Range	Size and ecology	IUCN status and estimated population
Cowan's shrew tenrec	M. cowani Thomas, 1882	Madagascar	Size: 6–10 cm (2–4 in) long, plus 6–8 cm (2–3 in) tail Habitat: Forest Diet: Insects and other invertebrates, as well as small vertebrates	LC Unknown
Drouhard's shrew tenrec	M. drouhardi Grandidier, 1934	Eastern Madagascar	Size: 6–9 cm (2–4 in) long, plus 5–9 cm (2–4 in) tail Habitat: Forest Diet: Insects and other invertebrates, as well as small vertebrates	LC Unknown
Dryad shrew tenrec	M. dryas Jenkins, 1992	Northeastern Madagascar	Size: 17–18 cm (7–7 in) long, plus tail Habitat: Forest Diet: Invertebrates	VU Unknown
Gracile shrew tenrec	M. gracilis (Major, 1896)	Eastern Madagascar	Size: 16–19 cm (6–7 in) long, plus tail Habitat: Forest Diet: Believed to be insects, earthworms, and other invertebrates	LC Unknown
Grandidier's shrew tenrec	M. grandidieri Olson, Rakotomalala, Hildebrandt, Lanier, Raxworthy, Goodman, 2009	Western Madagascar	Size: 5–8 cm (2–3 in) long, plus 3–4 cm (1–2 in) tail Habitat: Forest and shrubland Diet: Believed to be insects and other invertebrates	LC Unknown
Greater long-tailed shrew tenrec	M. principula Thomas, 1926	Eastern Madagascar	Size: 7–8 cm (3 in) long, plus 14–18 cm (6–7 in) tail Habitat: Forest Diet: Insects and other invertebrates, as well as small vertebrates	LC Unknown
Jenkins's shrew tenrec	M. jenkinsae Goodman, Soarimalala, 2004	Southwestern Madagascar	Size: 7–8 cm (3 in) long, plus 7–9 cm (3–4 in) tail Habitat: Forest and shrubland Diet: Insects and other invertebrates	EN Unknown
Least shrew tenrec	M. pusilla Major, 1896	Eastern Madagascar	Size: 4–6 cm (2 in) long, plus 6–8 cm (2–3 in) tail Habitat: Forest and inland wetlands Diet: Insects and other invertebrates	LC Unknown
Lesser long-tailed shrew tenrec	M. longicaudata Thomas, 1882	Central and northern Madagascar	Size: 6–8 cm (2–3 in) long, plus 11–16 cm (4–6 in) tail Habitat: Forest Diet: Insects, arachnids, crustaceans, and other invertebrates	LC Unknown
Major's long-tailed tenrec	M. majori Thomas, 1918	Madagascar	Size: 5–7 cm (2–3 in) long, plus 10–14 cm (4–6 in) tail Habitat: Forest Diet: Insects and other invertebrates	LC Unknown
Montane shrew tenrec	M. monticola Goodman, Jenkins, 1998	Northeastern Madagascar	Size: 7–10 cm (3–4 in) long, plus 9–12 cm (4–5 in) tail Habitat: Forest Diet: Insects and other invertebrates	VU Unknown
Naked-nosed shrew tenrec	M. gymnorhyncha Jenkins, Goodman, Raxworthy, 1996	Eastern Madagascar	Size: 13–18 cm (5–7 in) long, plus tail Habitat: Forest Diet: Insects, as well as small mammals, amphibians, vegetation, and potentially carrion	LC Unknown
Nasolo's shrew tenrec	M. nasoloi Jenkins, 1999	Western Madagascar	Size: About 8 cm (3 in) long, plus 5 cm (2 in) tail Habitat: Forest Diet: Insects and other invertebrates	VU Unknown
Northern shrew tenrec	M. jobihely Goodman, Raxworthy, Maminirina, Olson, 2006	Eastern and northern Madagascar	Size: 4–7 cm (2–3 in) long, plus 4–6 cm (2 in) tail Habitat: Forest Diet: Insects and other invertebrates	EN Unknown
Pale shrew tenrec	M. fotsifotsy Jenkins, Raxworthy, Nussbaum, 1997	Eastern and northern Madagascar	Size: 6–9 cm (2–4 in) long, plus 7–10 cm (3–4 in) tail Habitat: Forest Diet: Insects and other invertebrates	LC Unknown
Pygmy shrew tenrec	M. parvula Grandidier, 1934	Eastern and northern Madagascar	Size: 5–7 cm (2–3 in) long, plus 4–7 cm (2–3 in) tail Habitat: Forest Diet: Insects and other invertebrates	LC Unknown
Short-tailed shrew tenrec	M. brevicaudata Grandidier, 1899	Western and northern Madagascar	Size: 6–7 cm (2–3 in) long, plus 3 cm (1 in) tail Habitat: Forest and shrubland Diet: Insects and small vertebrates	LC Unknown
Shrew-toothed shrew tenrec	M. soricoides Jenkins, 1993	Eastern Madagascar	Size: 7–11 cm (3–4 in) long, plus 8–11 cm (3–4 in) tail Habitat: Forest Diet: Insects and other invertebrates, as well as small vertebrates	LC Unknown
Taiva shrew tenrec	M. taiva Major, 1896	Eastern Madagascar	Size: 5–8 cm (2–3 in) long, plus 7–9 cm (3–4 in) tail Habitat: Forest Diet: Insects and other invertebrates	LC Unknown
Thomas's shrew tenrec	M. thomasi Major, 1896	Eastern Madagascar	Size: 7–12 cm (3–5 in) long, plus 5–8 cm (2–3 in) tail Habitat: Forest Diet: Insects and other invertebrates	LC Unknown
Web-footed tenrec	M. mergulus Major, 1896	Eastern Madagascar	Size: 12–17 cm (5–7 in) long, plus 11–17 cm (4–7 in) tail Habitat: Forest and inland wetlands Diet: Insects, as well as tadpoles and crayfish	VU Unknown

Genus Nesogale – Thomas, 1918 – two species
Common name	Scientific name and subspecies	Range	Size and ecology	IUCN status and estimated population
Dobson's shrew tenrec	N. dobsoni (Thomas, 1884)	Eastern and northern Madagascar	Size: 9–12 cm (4–5 in) long, plus 10–11 cm (4 in) tail Habitat: Forest Diet: Insects and ant eggs	LC Unknown
Talazac's shrew tenrec	N. talazaci (Major, 1896)	Eastern Madagascar	Size: 4–13 cm (2–5 in) long, plus 4–16 cm (2–6 in) tail Habitat: Forest Diet: Insects as well as frogs	LC Unknown

Genus Oryzorictes – Grandidier, 1870 – two species
Common name	Scientific name and subspecies	Range	Size and ecology	IUCN status and estimated population
Four-toed rice tenrec	O. tetradactylus Milne-Edwards, Grandidier, 1882	Southeastern Madagascar	Size: 10–12 cm (4–5 in) long, plus 4–6 cm (2 in) tail Habitat: Forest, shrubland, grassland, and inland wetlands Diet: Worms, insects, and other invertebrates	DD Unknown
Mole-like rice tenrec	O. hova Grandidier, 1870	Eastern and northern Madagascar	Size: 9–13 cm (4–5 in) long, plus tail Habitat: Forest and inland wetlands Diet: insects and earthworms, as well as plants	LC Unknown

===== Subfamily Tenrecinae =====
Genus Echinops – Linnaeus, 1753 – one species
Common name	Scientific name and subspecies	Range	Size and ecology	IUCN status and estimated population
Lesser hedgehog tenrec	E. telfairi Martin, 1838	Southwestern Madagascar	Size: 14–18 cm (6–7 in) long, plus 13–17 cm (5–7 in) tail Habitat: Forest, savanna, shrubland, and grassland Diet: Insects and fruit	LC Unknown

Genus Hemicentetes – Mivart, 1871 – two species
Common name	Scientific name and subspecies	Range	Size and ecology	IUCN status and estimated population
Highland streaked tenrec	H. nigriceps Günther, 1875	Eastern Madagascar	Size: 12–16 cm (5–6 in) long Habitat: Forest and savanna Diet: Soft-bodied invertebrates	LC Unknown
Lowland streaked tenrec	H. semispinosus (Cuvier, 1798)	Eastern Madagascar	Size: 13–19 cm (5–7 in) long Habitat: Forest and shrubland Diet: Worms and other invertebrates	LC Unknown

Genus Setifer – (Froriep, 1806) – one species
Common name	Scientific name and subspecies	Range	Size and ecology	IUCN status and estimated population
Greater hedgehog tenrec	S. setosus (Schreber, 1778)	Madagascar	Size: 16–23 cm (6–9 in) long, plus tail Habitat: Forest, savanna, shrubland, and grassland Diet: Insects, grubs, other invertebrates, and fruit	LC Unknown

Genus Tenrec – Lacépède, 1799 – one species
Common name	Scientific name and subspecies	Range	Size and ecology	IUCN status and estimated population
Tailless tenrec	T. ecaudatus (Schreber, 1777)	Madagascar	Size: 26–39 cm (10–15 in) long Habitat: Forest, savanna, shrubland, and grassland Diet: Invertebrates, as well as vegetation, fruit, reptiles, amphibians, and small mammals	LC Unknown

== Sources ==
- Garbutt, Nick (2007). Mammals of Madagascar. Yale University Press. ISBN 978-0-300-12550-4.
- Bronner, Gary N. (2013). Kingdon, Jonathan; Happold, David; Hoffmann, Michael; Butynski, Thomas; Happold, Meredith; Kalina, Jan (eds.). The Mammals of Africa. Vol. I: Introductory Chapters and Afrotheria. Bloomsbury Publishing. ISBN 978-1-4081-8996-2.
- Mittermeier, Russell A.; Wilson, Don E. (2018). Handbook of the Mammals of the World. Vol. 8. Insectivores, Sloths and Colugos. Lynx Edicions. ISBN 978-84-16728-08-4.
- Bronner, Gary N.; Jenkins, Paulina D. (2005). Wilson, Don E.; Reeder, DeeAnn M. (eds.). Mammal Species of the World. Vol. 1 (3rd ed.). Johns Hopkins University Press. ISBN 978-0-8018-8221-0.
