= Mole (animal) =

Common name for several small mammals

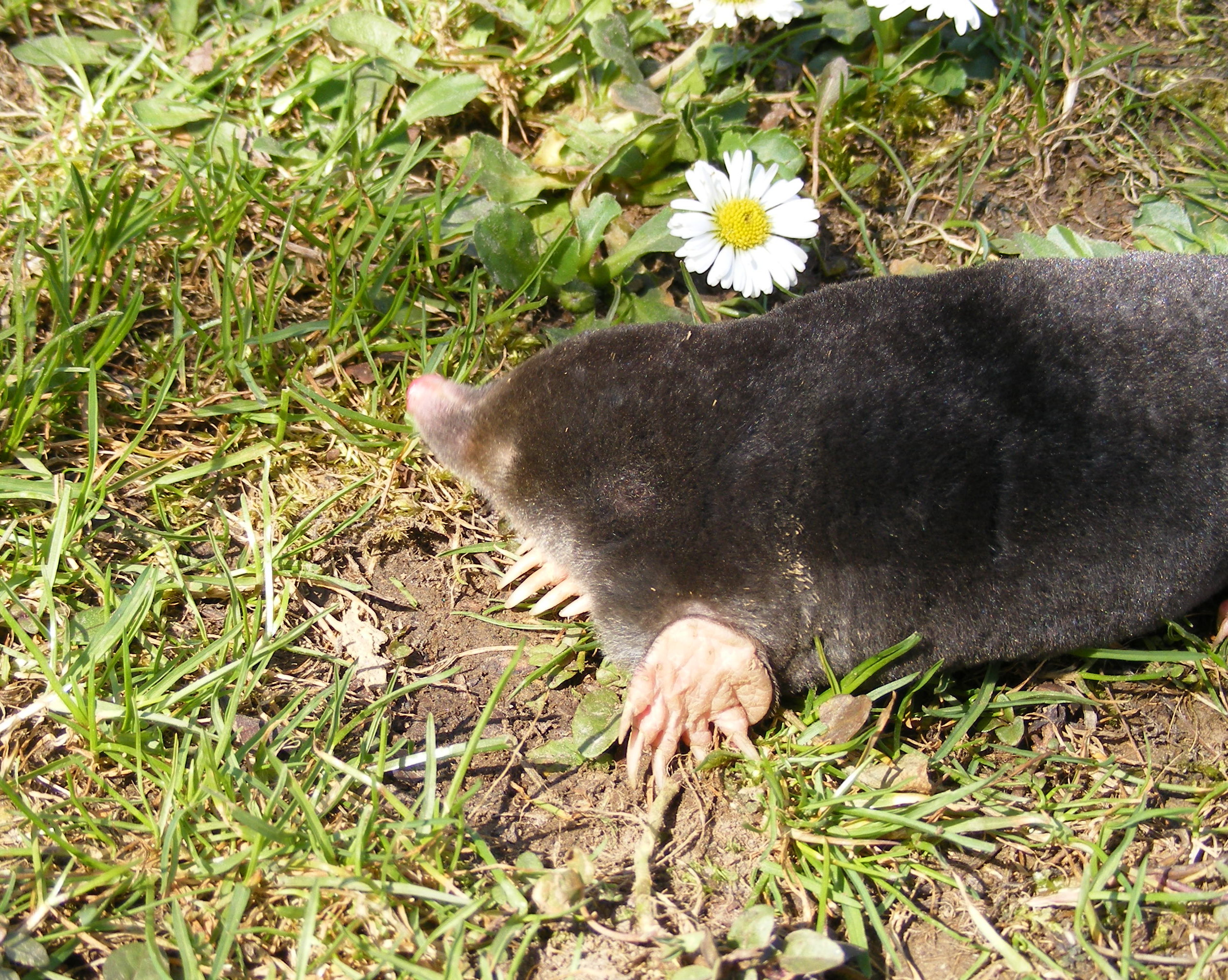
European mole next to a flower

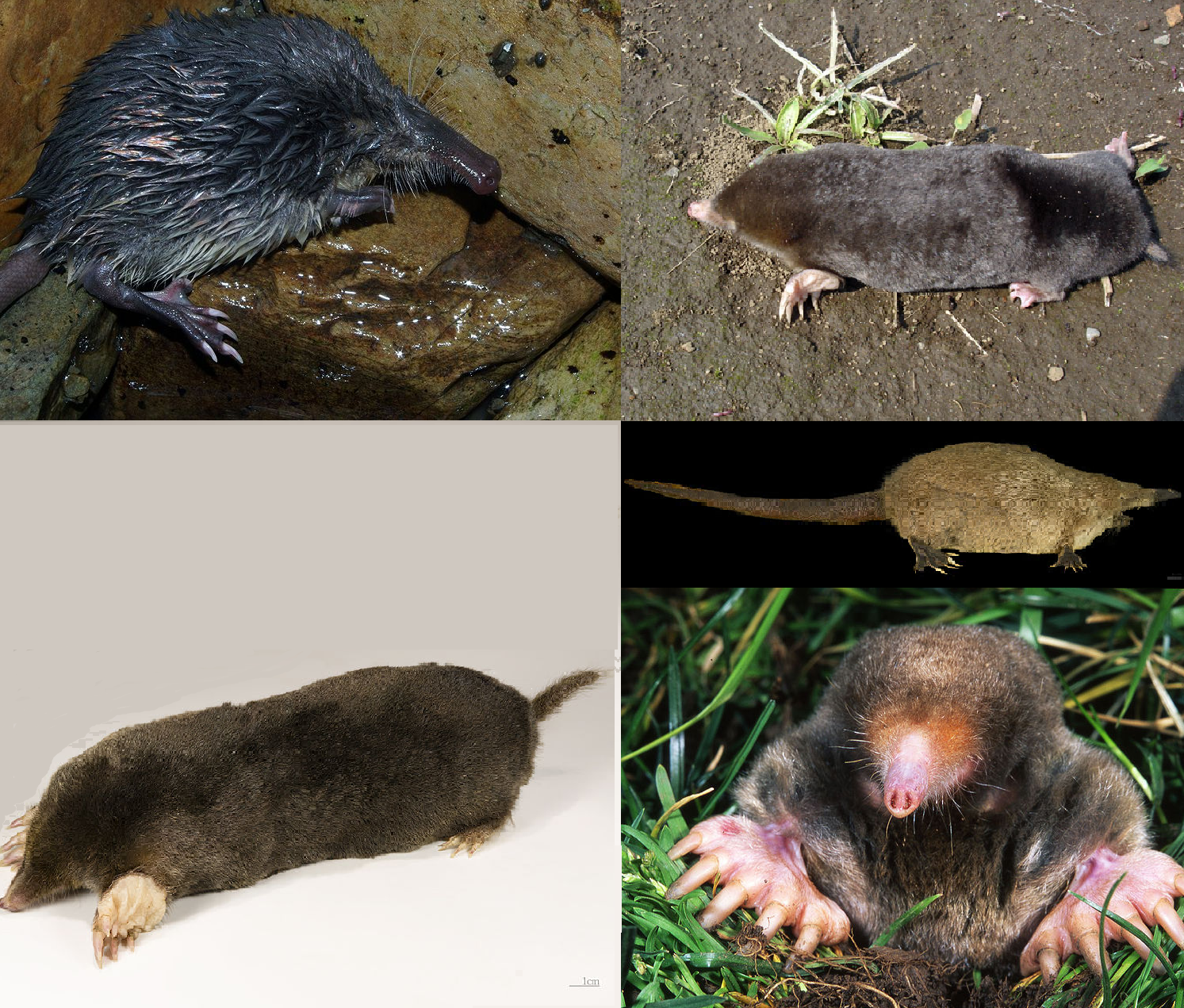
Various moles

Moles are small, subterranean mammals. They have cylindrical bodies, velvety fur, very small, inconspicuous eyes and ears, reduced hindlimbs, and short, powerful forelimbs with large paws adapted for digging.

The word "mole" most commonly refers to many species in the family Talpidae (which are named after the Latin word for mole, talpa). True moles are found in most parts of North America, Europe (except for Ireland) and Asia. Other mammals referred to as moles include the African golden moles and the Australian marsupial moles, which have a similar ecology and lifestyle to true moles but are unrelated.

Moles may be viewed as pests to gardeners, but they provide positive contributions to soil, gardens, and ecosystems, including soil aeration, feeding on slugs and small creatures that eat plant roots, and providing prey for other wildlife. They eat earthworms and other small invertebrates in the soil.

== Terminology ==
In Middle English, moles were known as moldwarps. (Note: "Thus was the great mountain turned scant to a little molehill" - the expression "a mountain out of a molehill" is found in (pub. 1626) The mirrour of vertue in worldly greatnes; or the life of Syr T. More..) By the era of Early Modern English, the mole was also known in English as mouldywarp or mouldiwarp, (Note: Also Mouldwarp, Moldiwarp, Moldywarp.) a word having cognates in other Germanic languages such as German (Maulwurf), and Danish, Norwegian, Swedish and Icelandic (muldvarp, moldvarp, mullvad, moldvarpa), where muld/mull/mold refers to soil and varp/vad/varpa refers to throwing, hence "one who throws soil" or "dirt-tosser".

Male moles are called "boars"; females are called "sows".

== Characteristics ==
=== Underground breathing ===
Moles have been found to tolerate higher levels of carbon dioxide than other mammals, because their blood cells have a special form of hemoglobin that has a higher affinity to oxygen than other forms. In addition, moles use oxygen more effectively by reusing the exhaled air, and can survive in low-oxygen environments, such as burrows.

=== Extra thumbs ===
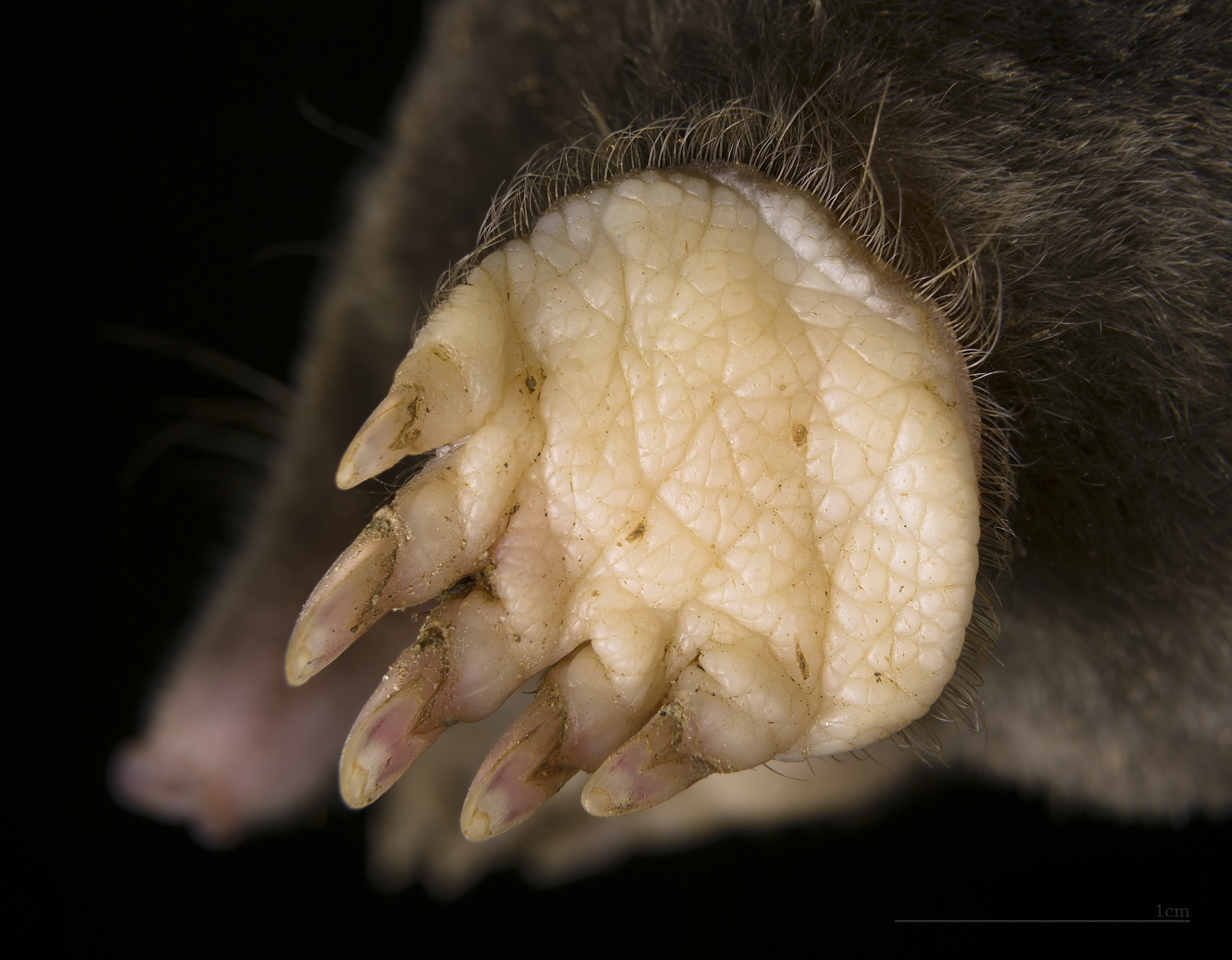
Mole paw

Moles have polydactyl forepaws: each has an extra thumb (also known as a prepollex) next to the regular thumb. While the mole's other digits have multiple joints, the prepollex has a single, sickle-shaped bone that develops later and differently from the other fingers during embryogenesis from a transformed sesamoid bone in the wrist, independently evolved but similar to the giant panda thumb. This supernumerary digit is species-specific, as it is not present in shrews, the mole's closest relatives. Androgenic steroids are known to affect the growth and formation of bones, and a connection is possible between this species-specific trait and the male genital apparatus in female moles of many mole species (gonads with testicular and ovary tissues).

== Diet ==
Moles are omnivores, but their diet primarily consists of earthworms and other small invertebrates found in the soil. The mole runs are in reality "worm traps", the mole sensing when a worm falls into the tunnel and quickly running along to kill and eat it. Because their saliva contains a toxin that can paralyze earthworms, moles are able to store their still-living prey for later consumption. They construct special underground "larders" for just this purpose; researchers have discovered such larders with over a thousand earthworms in them. Before eating earthworms, moles pull them between their squeezed paws to force the collected earth and dirt out of the worm's gut.

The star-nosed mole can detect, catch and eat food faster than the human eye can follow.

== Breeding ==
Breeding season for a mole depends on species, but is generally from February through May. Males search for females by letting out high-pitched squeals and tunneling through foreign areas.

The gestation period of the Eastern (North America) mole (Scalopus aquaticus) is approximately 42 days. Three to five young are born, mainly in March and early April. Townsend's moles mate in February and March, and the 2–4 young are born in March and April after a gestation period of about 1 month.

== Social structure ==
Moles appear to be solitary creatures, coming together only to mate. Territories may overlap, but moles avoid each other and males may fight fiercely if they meet.

== Classification ==
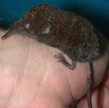
Uropsilus

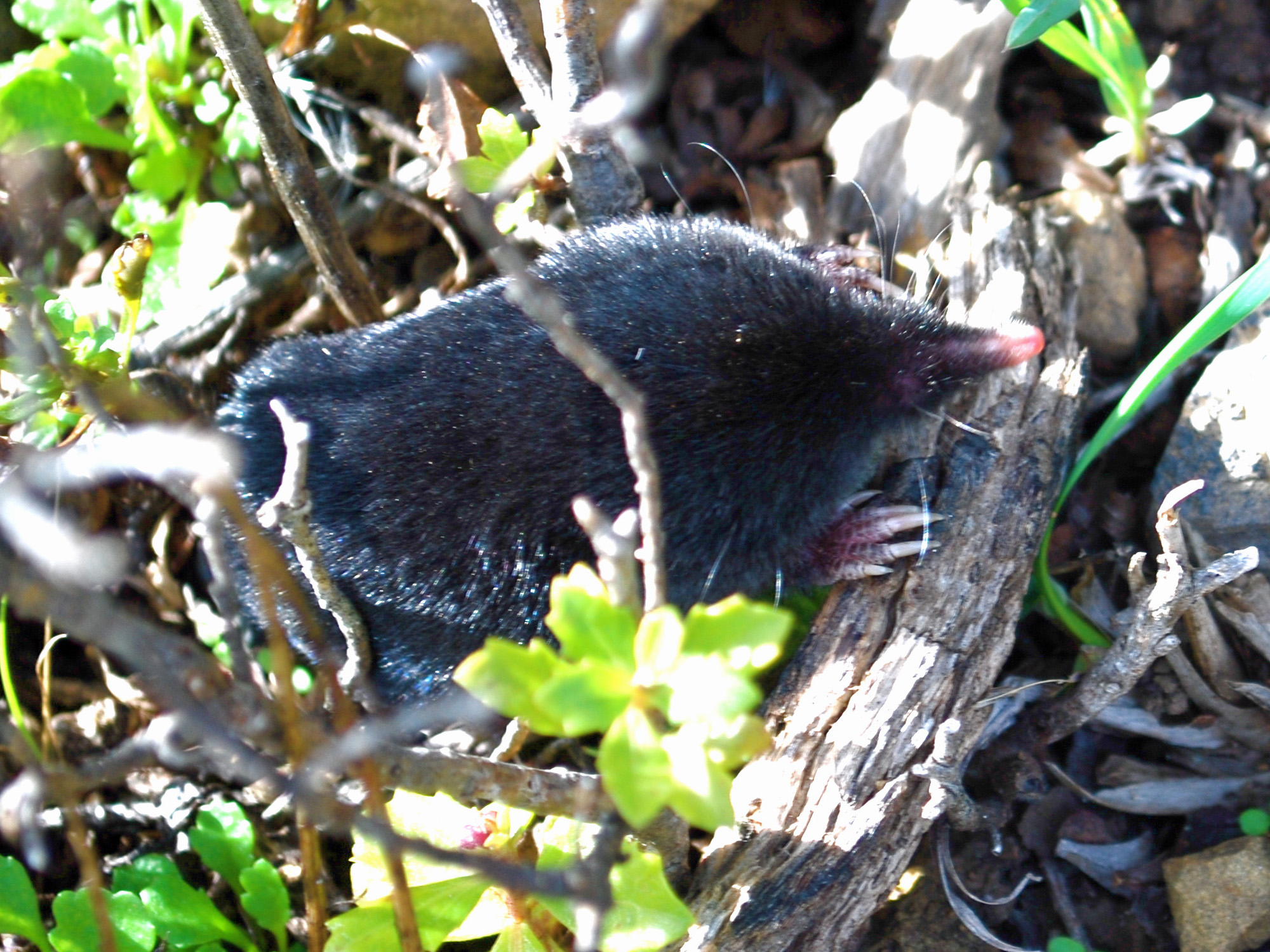
Northern broad-footed mole

The family Talpidae contains all the true moles and some of their close relatives. Those species called "shrew moles" represent an intermediate form between the moles and their shrew ancestors, and as such may not be fully described by the article.

Moles were traditionally classified in the order Insectivora, but that order has since been abandoned because it has been shown to not be monophyletic. Moles are now classified with shrews and hedgehogs, in the more narrowly defined order Eulipotyphla.

- Subfamily Scalopinae: New World moles
  - Tribe Condylurini: Star-nosed mole (North America)
    - Genus Condylura: Star-nosed mole (the sole species)
  - Tribe Scalopini: New World moles
    - Genus Alpiscaptulus: Medog mole (China)
    - Genus Parascalops: Hairy-tailed mole (northeastern North America)
    - Genus Scalopus: Eastern mole (North America)
    - Genus Scapanulus: Gansu mole (China)
    - Genus Scapanus: Western North American moles (five species)
- Subfamily Talpinae: Old World moles, desmans, and shrew moles
  - Tribe Desmanini
    - Genus Desmana: Russian desman
    - Genus Galemys: Pyrenean desman
  - Tribe Talpini: Old World moles
    - Genus Euroscaptor: Ten Asian species
    - Genus Mogera: Nine species from Japan, Korea, and eastern China
    - Genus Parascaptor: White-tailed mole, southern Asia
    - Genus Scaptochirus: Short-faced mole, China
    - Genus Talpa: Thirteen species, Europe and western Asia
  - Tribe Scaptonychini: Long-tailed mole
    - Genus Scaptonyx: Long-tailed mole (China and Myanmar (Burma))
  - Tribe Urotrichini: Japanese shrew moles
    - Genus Dymecodon: True's shrew mole
    - Genus Urotrichus: Japanese shrew mole
  - Tribe Neurotrichini: New World shrew moles
    - Genus Neurotrichus: American shrew mole (US Pacific Northwest, southwest British Columbia)
- Subfamily Uropsilinae: Asian shrew moles
  - Genus Uropsilus: Five species in China, Bhutan, and Myanmar (Burma)

== Other "moles" ==
Many groups of burrowing animals (pink fairy armadillos, tuco-tucos, mole rats, mole crickets, pygmy mole crickets, and mole crabs) have independently developed close physical similarities with moles due to convergent evolution; two of these are so similar to true moles, they are commonly called and thought of as "moles" in common English, although they are completely unrelated to true moles or to each other. These are the golden moles of southern Africa and the marsupial moles of Australia. While difficult to distinguish from each other, they are most easily distinguished from true moles by shovel-like patches on their noses, which they use in tandem with their abbreviated forepaws to swim through sandy soils.

=== Golden moles ===
The golden moles belong to the same branch on the phylogenetic tree as the tenrecs, called Tenrecomorpha, which, in turn, stem from a main branch of placental mammals called the Afrosoricida. This means that they share a closer common ancestor with such existing afrosoricids as elephants, manatees and aardvarks than they do with other placental mammals, such as true Talpidae moles.

- ORDER AFROSORICIDA
  - Suborder Tenrecomorpha
    - Family Tenrecidae: tenrecs, 34 species in 10 genera
  - Suborder Chrysochloridea
    - Family Chrysochloridae
      - Subfamily Chrysochlorinae
        - Genus Carpitalpa
          - Arends' golden mole (Carpitalpa arendsi)
        - Genus Chlorotalpa
          - Duthie's golden mole (Chlorotalpa duthieae)
          - Sclater's golden mole (Chlorotalpa sclateri)
        - Genus Chrysochloris
          - Subgenus Chrysochloris
            - Cape golden mole (Chrysochloris asiatica)
            - Visagie's golden mole (Chrysochloris visagiei)
          - Subgenus Kilimatalpa
            - Stuhlmann's golden mole (Chrysochloris stuhlmanni)
        - Genus Chrysospalax
          - Giant golden mole (Chrysospalax trevelyani)
          - Rough-haired golden mole (Chrysospalax villosus)
        - Genus Cryptochloris
          - De Winton's golden mole (Cryptochloris wintoni)
          - Van Zyl's golden mole (Cryptochloris zyli)
        - Genus Eremitalpa
          - Grant's golden mole (Eremitalpa granti)
      - Subfamily Amblysominae
        - Genus Amblysomus
          - Fynbos golden mole (Amblysomus corriae)
          - Hottentot golden mole (Amblysomus hottentotus)
          - Marley's golden mole (Amblysomus marleyi)
          - Robust golden mole (Amblysomus robustus)
          - Highveld golden mole (Amblysomus septentrionalis)
        - Genus Calcochloris
          - Subgenus Huetia
            - Congo golden mole (Calcochloris leucorhinus)
          - Subgenus Calcochloris
            - Yellow golden mole (Calcochloris obtusirostris)
          - Subgenus incertae sedis
            - Somali golden mole (Calcochloris tytonis)
        - Genus Neamblysomus
          - Juliana's golden mole (Neamblysomus julianae)
          - Gunning's golden mole (Neamblysomus gunningi)

=== Marsupial moles ===
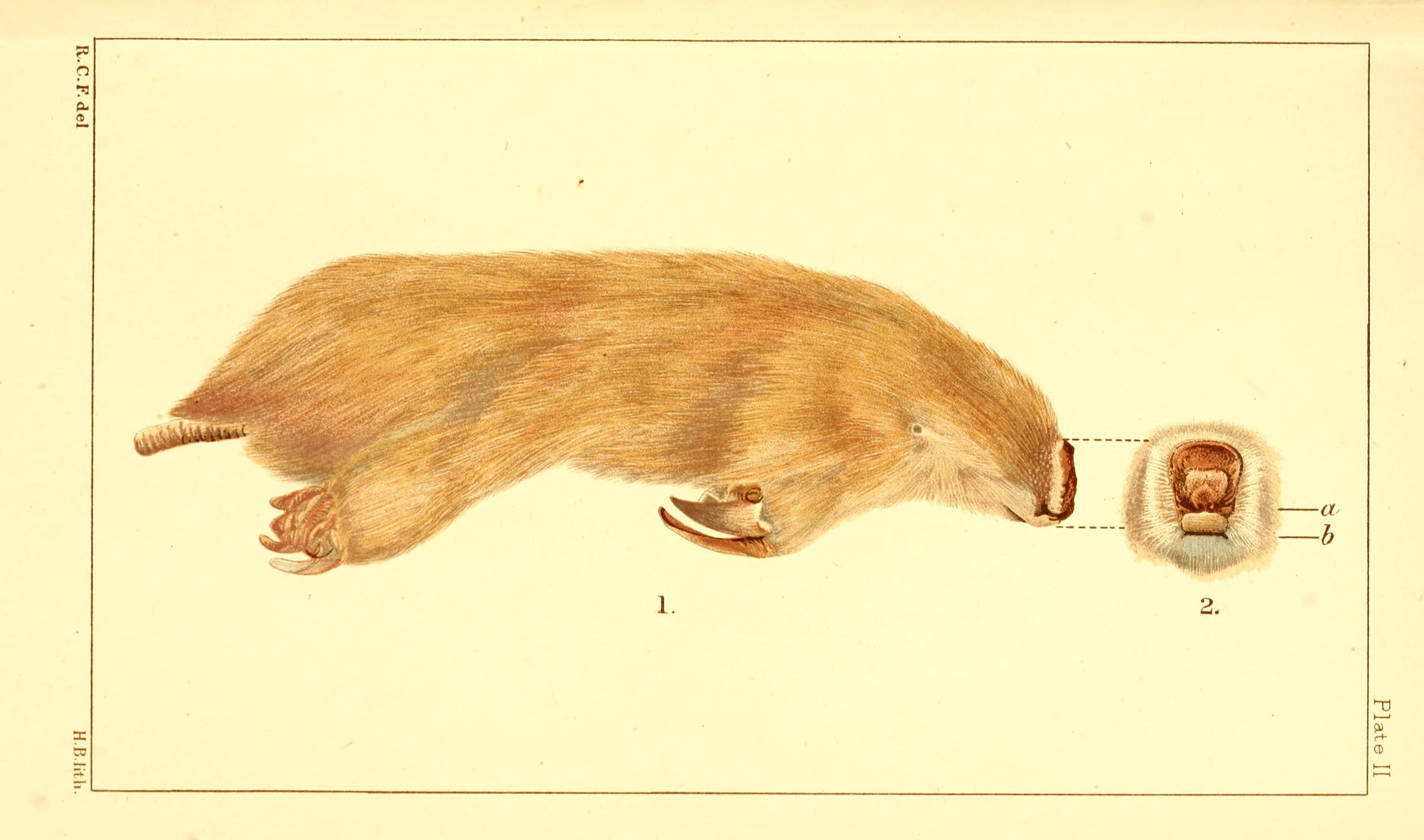
A marsupial mole

As marsupials, these moles are even more distantly related to true talpid moles than golden moles are, both of which belong to the Eutheria, or placental mammals. This means that they are more closely related to such existing Australian marsupials as kangaroos or koalas, and even to a lesser extent to American marsupials, such as opossums, than they are to placental mammals, such as golden or Talpidae moles.

Class Mammalia

- Subclass Prototheria: monotremes (echidnas and the platypus)
- Subclass Theriiformes: live-bearing mammals and their prehistoric relatives
  - Infraclass Holotheria: modern live-bearing mammals and their prehistoric relatives
    - Supercohort Theria: live-bearing mammals
      - Cohort Marsupialia: marsupials
        - Magnorder Ameridelphia: New World marsupials
          - Order Didelphimorphia (opossums)
          - Order Paucituberculata (shrew opossums)
        - Superorder Australidelphia Australian marsupials
          - Order Dasyuromorphia (the Tasmanian devil, the numbat, thylacines, quolls, dunnarts and others)
          - Order Peramelemorphia (bilbies, bandicoots and rainforest bandicoots)
          - Order Diprotodontia (koalas, wombats, diprotodonts, possums, cuscuses, sugar gliders, kangaroos and others)
          - Order Notoryctemorphia (marsupial moles and closely related extinct families of marsupials)
            - Family Notoryctidae (living and extinct marsupial mole genera)
              - Genus Notoryctes (only genus of marsupial moles with living species)
                - Species Notoryctes typhlops (southern marsupial mole)
                - Species Notoryctes caurinus (northern marsupial mole)

== Interaction with humans ==
=== Pelts ===
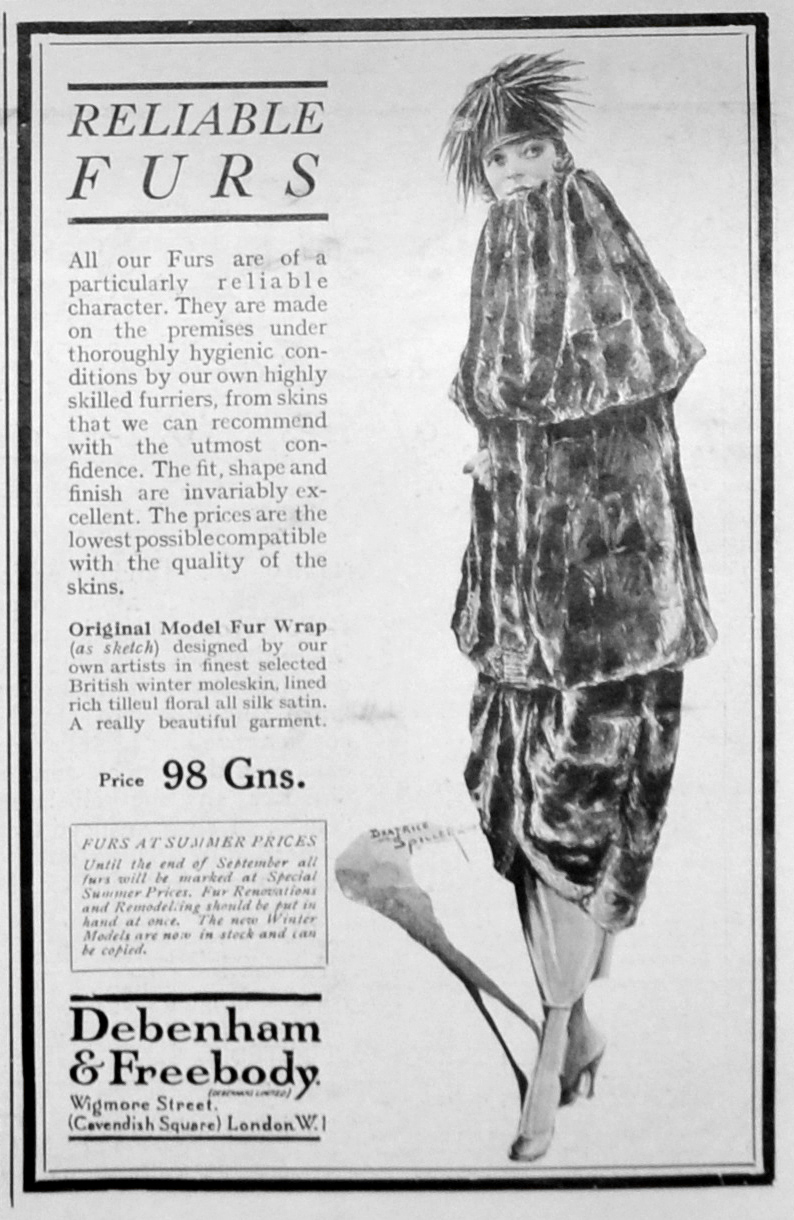
Advertisement in Illustrated Sporting and Dramatic News, 1921

Moles' pelts have a velvety texture not found in surface animals. Surface-dwelling animals tend to have longer fur with a natural tendency for the nap to lie in a particular direction, but to facilitate their burrowing lifestyle, mole pelts are short and very dense and have no particular direction to the nap. This makes it easy for moles to move backwards underground, as their fur is not "brushed the wrong way". The leather is extremely soft and supple. According to tradition, Queen Alexandra, the wife of Edward VII of the United Kingdom, ordered a mole-fur garment to start a fashion that would create a demand for mole fur, thereby turning what had been a serious pest problem in Scotland into a lucrative industry for the country. Hundreds of pelts are cut into rectangles and sewn together to make a coat. The natural color is taupe, (derived from the French noun taupe meaning mole) but it is readily dyed any color.

The term "moleskin" for a tough cotton fabric is in common use today.

=== Pest status: extermination and humane options ===
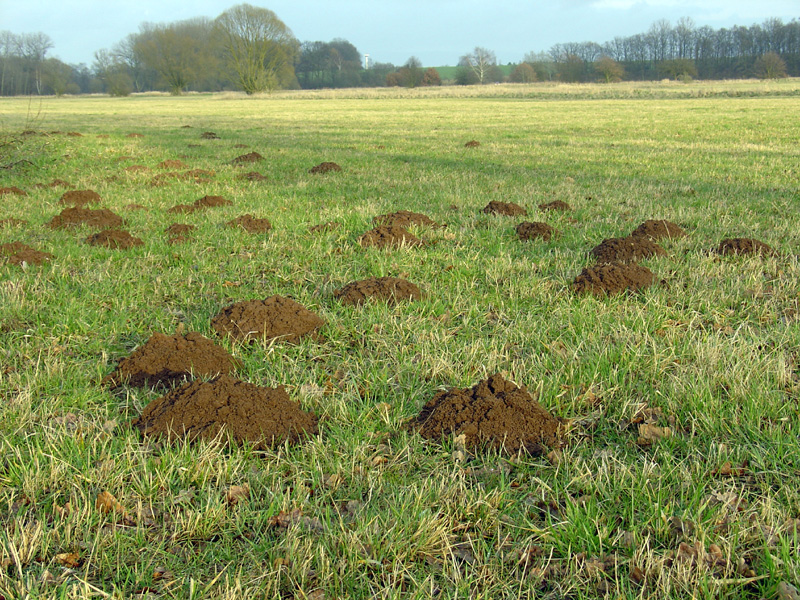
Molehills in eastern Bohemia

Moles are considered agricultural pests in some countries, while in others, such as Germany, they are a protected species, but may be killed with a permit. Problems cited as caused by moles include contamination of silage with soil particles, making it unpalatable to livestock, the covering of pasture with fresh soil reducing its size and yield, damage to agricultural machinery by the exposure of stones, damage to young plants through disturbance of the soil, weed invasion of pasture through exposure of freshly tilled soil, and damage to drainage systems and watercourses. Other species such as weasels and voles may use mole tunnels to gain access to enclosed areas or plant roots.

Moles burrow and raise molehills, killing parts of lawns. They can undermine plant roots, indirectly causing damage or death. Moles do not eat plant roots.

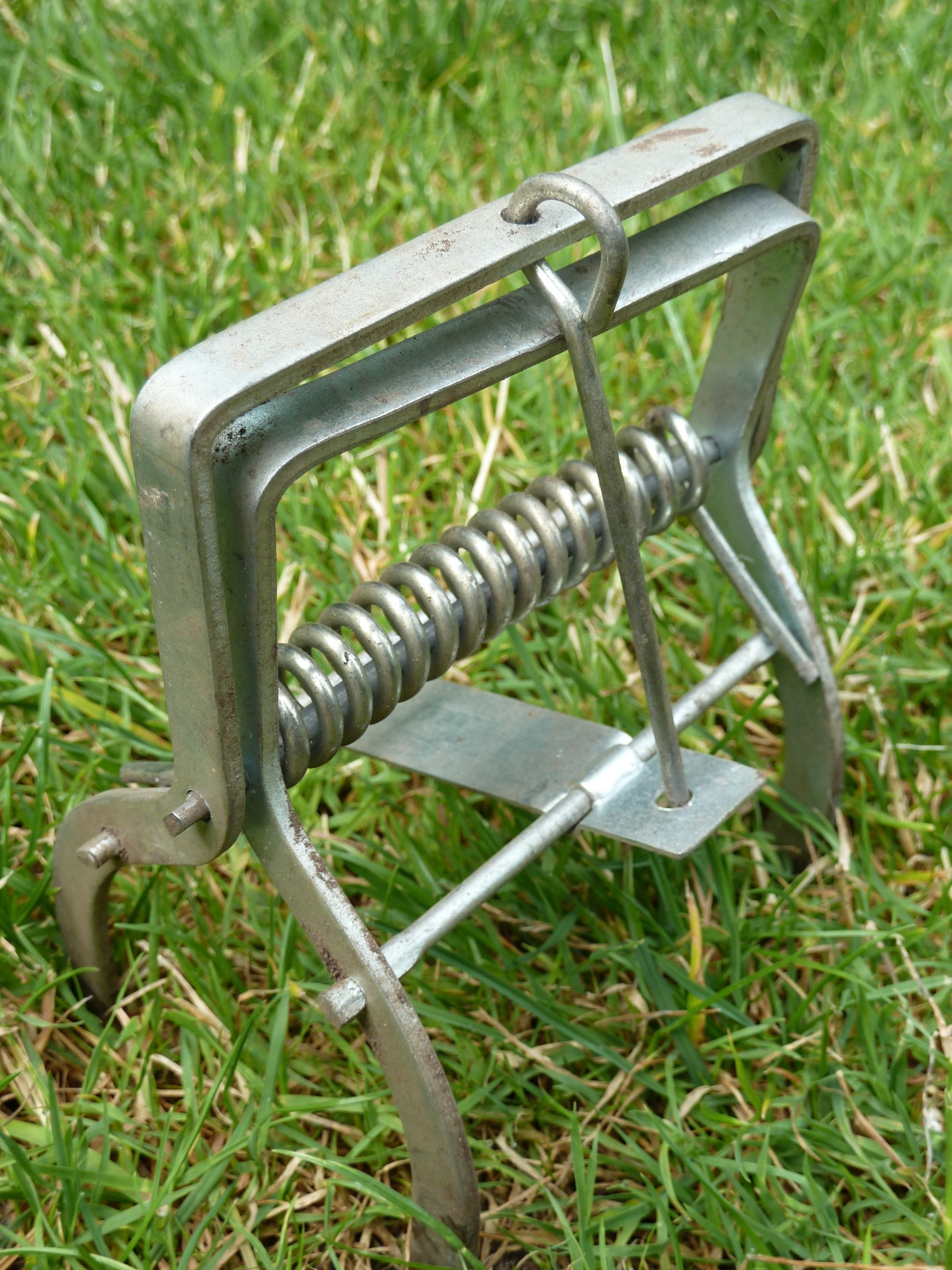
A mole trap

Moles are controlled with traps such as mole-catchers, smoke bombs, and poisons such as calcium carbide, which produces acetylene gas to drive moles away. Strychnine was also used for this purpose in the past. The most common method now is Phostoxin or Talunex tablets. They contain aluminium phosphide and are inserted in the mole tunnels, where they turn into phosphine gas (not be confused with phosgene gas). More recently, high-grade nitrogen gas has proven effective at killing moles, with the added advantage of having no polluting effect to the environment.

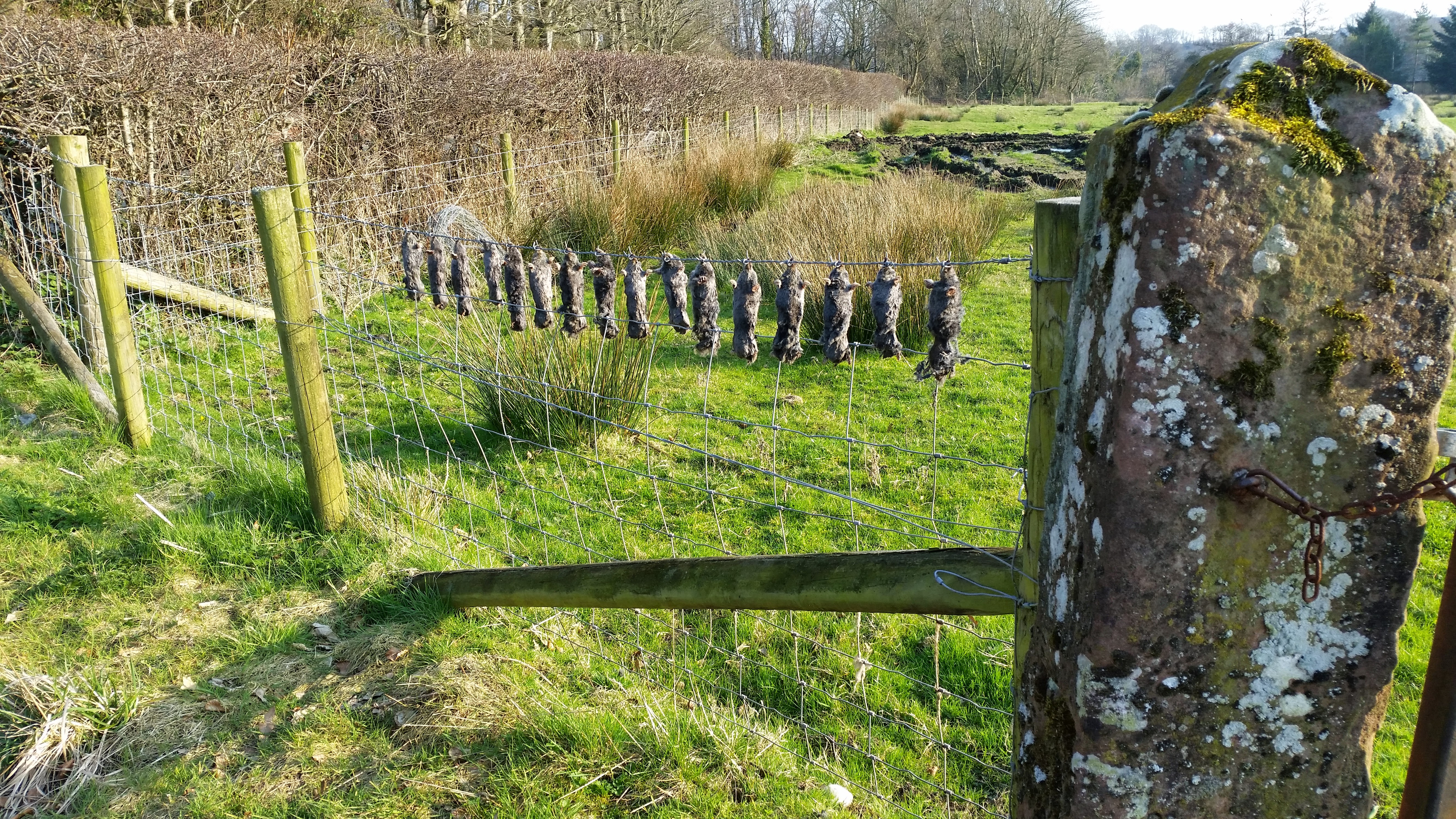
Dead moles traditionally hung on a fence after being caught.

Other common defensive measures include cat litter and blood meal, to repel the mole, or smoking its burrow. Devices are also sold to trap the mole in its burrow, when one sees the "mole hill" moving and therefore knows where the animal is, and then stabbing it.

Other humane options are also possible including humane traps that capture the mole alive so it may be transported elsewhere. In many contexts including ordinary gardens, the damage caused by moles to lawns is mostly visual, and it is possible instead of extermination to simply remove the earth of the molehills as they appear, leaving their permanent galleries for the moles to continue their existence underground. However, when the tunnels are near the surface in soft ground or after heavy rain, they may collapse, leaving (small) unsightly furrows in the lawn.

=== Meat ===
William Buckland, known for eating every animal he could, opined that mole meat tasted vile.

=== Archaeology ===
Moles can inadvertently help archaeologists by bringing small artifacts to the surface through their digging. By examining molehills for sherds and other small objects, archaeologists can find evidence of human habitation.

== See also ==
- Molecatcher
