= Namachloris =

Namachloris Temporal range: Bartonian

Scientific classification
- Kingdom: Animalia
- Phylum: Chordata
- Class: Mammalia
- Order: Afrosoricida
- Family: Chrysochloridae
- Genus: †Namachloris
- Species: †N. arenatans

Binomial name
- †Namachloris arenatans Pickford, 2015

Extinct genus of mammals

Namachloris is an extinct genus of chrysochlorid that lived during the Bartonian stage of the Eocene epoch.

== Distribution ==
Namachloris arenatans is known from the Eocliff Limestone of Namibia.

== Description ==
Like the Congo golden mole, the Hottentot golden mole, and the yellow golden mole, Namachloris had the middle ear's major blood vessels contained in bony tubes, a cochlea that was highly coiled, a secondary crus commune, a basicranium and lateral skull wall exhibiting high pneumatisation, and no identifiable canaliculus cochleae for the perilymphatic duct. Unlike these extant golden moles, Namachloris had a tensor tympani muscle and lacked a basicranial intercommunication linking the right and left ears.
