= Damarachloris =

Damarachloris Temporal range: Middle Eocene

Scientific classification
- Kingdom: Animalia
- Phylum: Chordata
- Class: Mammalia
- Order: Afrosoricida
- Family: Chrysochloridae
- Genus: †Damarachloris
- Species: †D. primaevus

Binomial name
- †Damarachloris primaevus Pickford, 2019

Damarachloris is an extinct genus of chrysochlorid that inhabited Namibia during the Eocene epoch. It contains a single species, D. primaevus.
