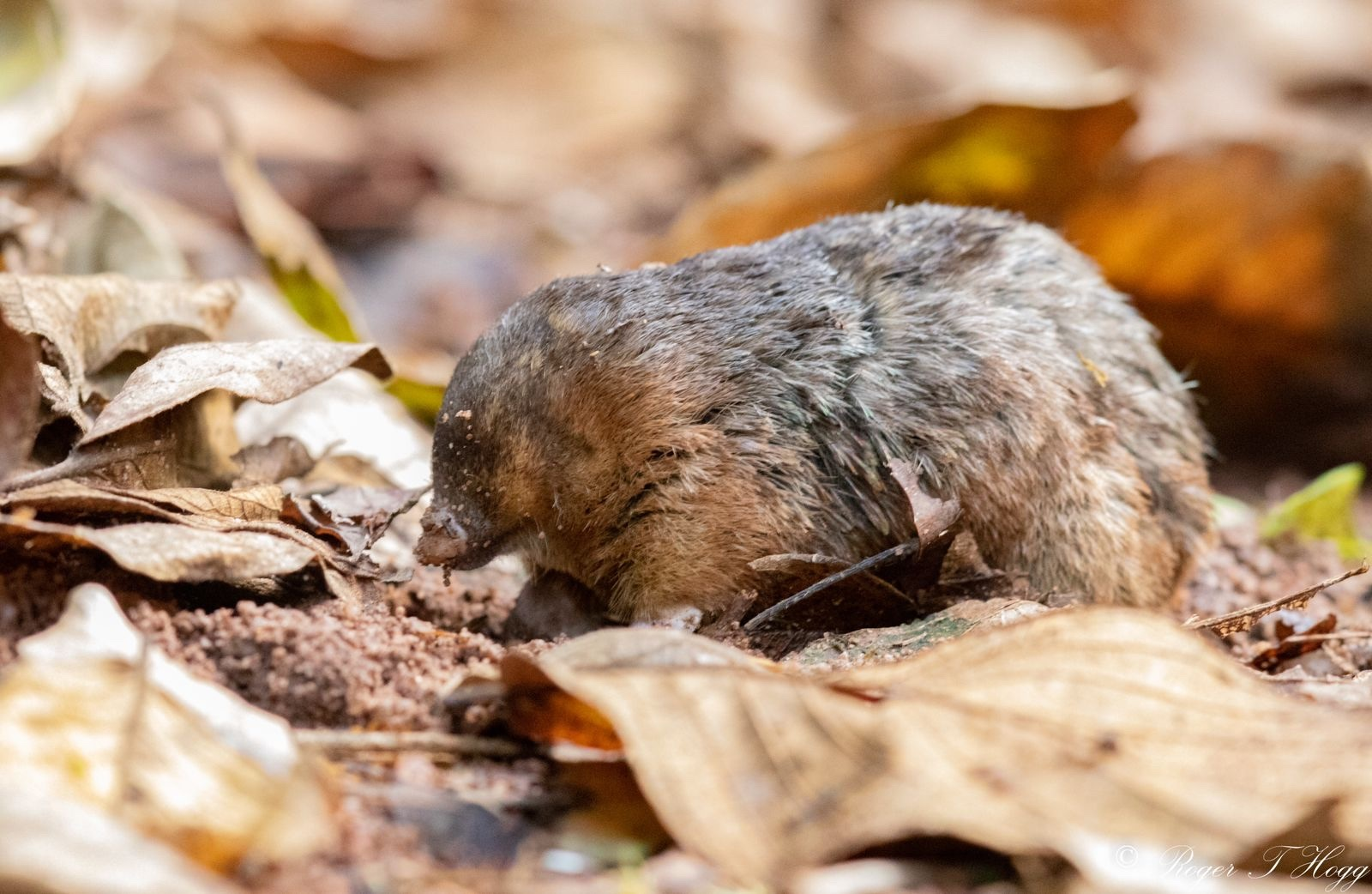
- Amblysomus hottentotus observed in Palmiet Nature Reserve near Durban, South Africa

Scientific classification
- Kingdom: Animalia
- Phylum: Chordata
- Class: Mammalia
- Order: Afrosoricida
- Suborder: Chrysochloridea; Broom, 1915
- Family: Chrysochloridae; Gray, 1825

Type genus
- Chrysochloris Lacépède, 1799

Genera
- Eremitalpa Roberts, 1924; Chrysospalax Gill, 1883; Chrysochloris Lacépède, 1799; Cryptochloris Shortridge & Carter, 1938; Carpitalpa Lundholm, 1955; Huetia Forcart, 1942; Chlorotalpa Roberts, 1924; Calcochloris Mivart, 1867; Amblysomus Pomel, 1848; Neamblysomus Roberts, 1924; †Damarachloris Pickford, 2019; †Diamantochloris Pickford, 2015; †Namachloris Pickford, 2015; †Proamblysomus Broom, 1941; †Prochrysochloris Butler & Hopwood, 1957
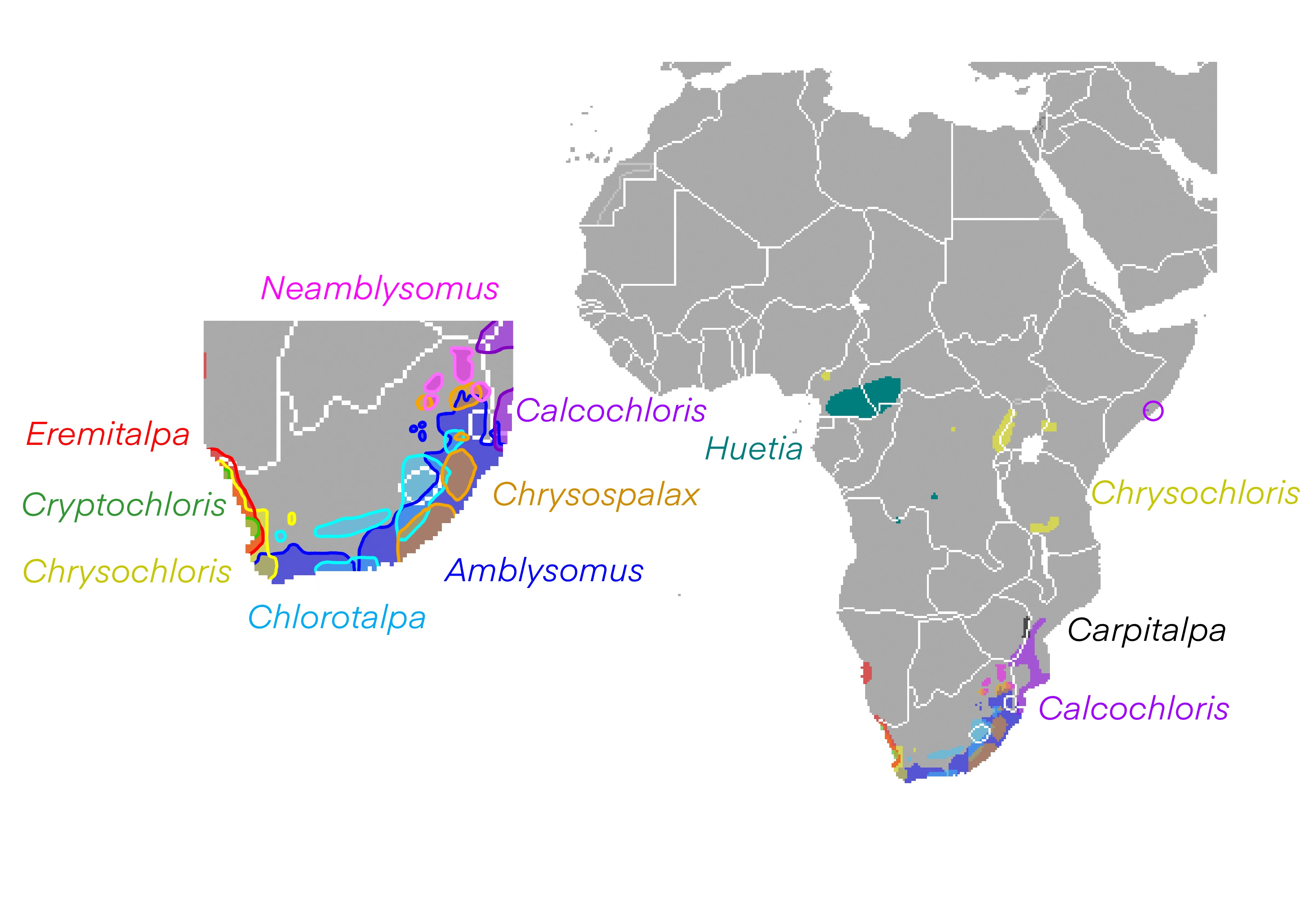

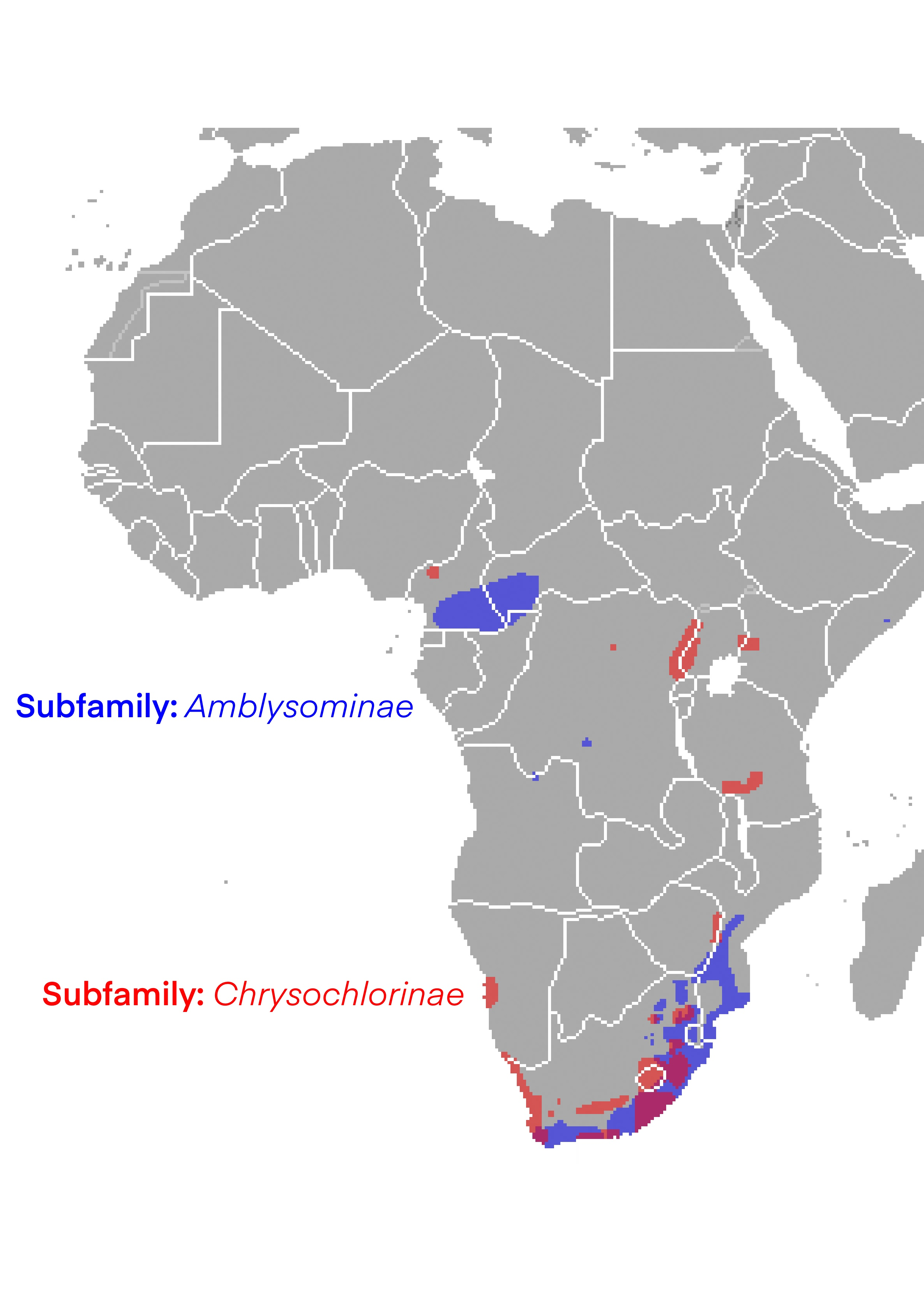
- Range map of the subfamilies of Chrysochloridae

= Golden mole =

Golden moles Temporal range: Lutetian–Recent

Monotypic family of mammals

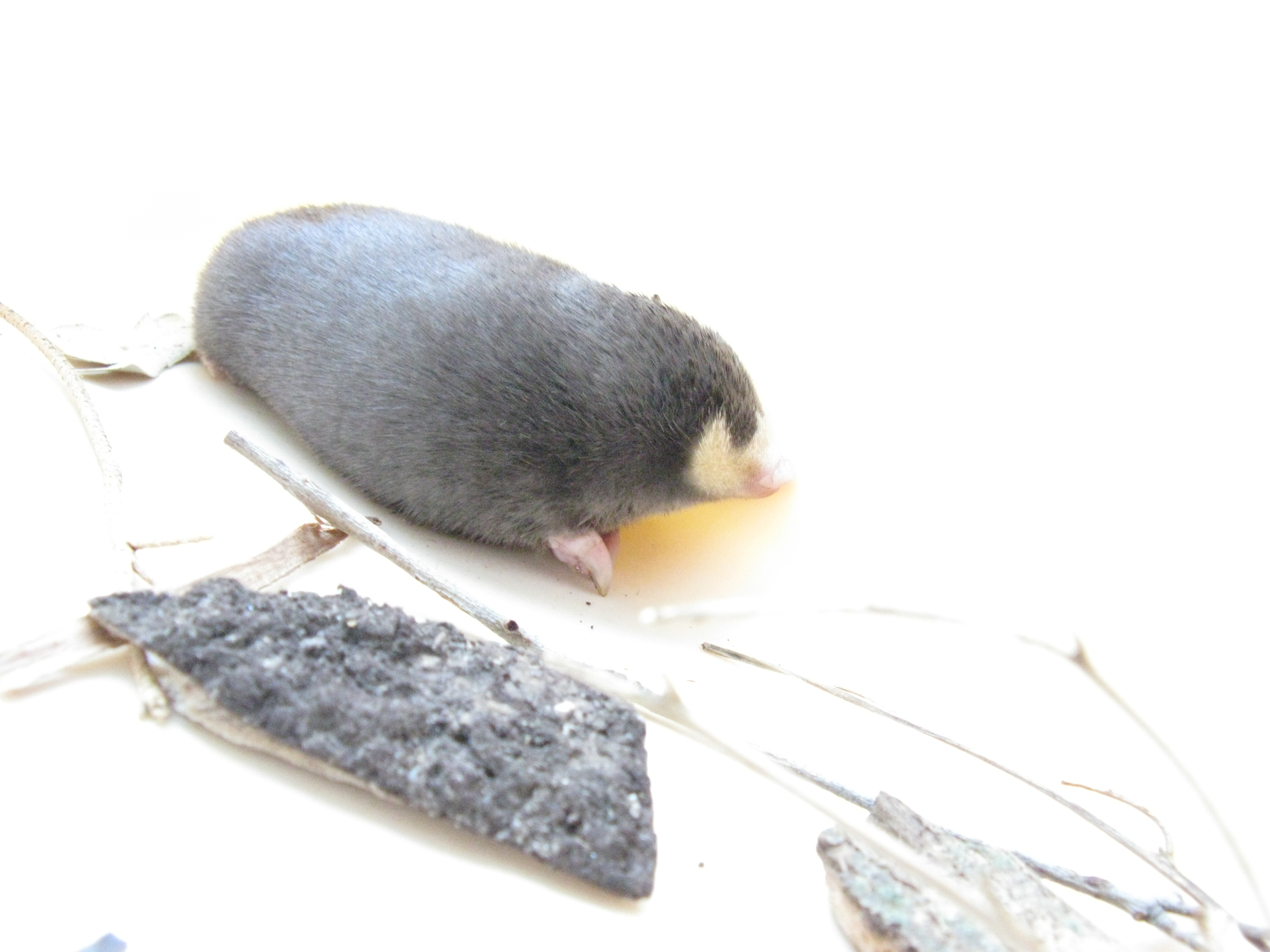
Cape golden mole (Chrysochloris asiatica) adult, showing the digging claw, absence of external eye and a hint of the iridescence of the fur. The rhinarium is not obvious in this photograph.

Golden moles are small insectivorous burrowing mammals endemic to Sub-Saharan Africa. They belong to the family Chrysochloridae (the only family in the suborder Chrysochloridea) and as such they are taxonomically distinct from the true moles, family Talpidae, and other mole-like families, all of which, to various degrees, they resemble as a result of evolutionary convergence. There are 21 species. Some (e.g., Chrysochloris asiatica, Amblysomus hottentotus) are relatively common, whereas others (e.g., species of Chrysospalax, Cryptochloris, Neamblysomus) are rare and endangered.

== Taxonomy ==
Despite their extreme evolutionary convergence with moles, their closest relatives are the otter shrews and tenrecs. They are more distantly related to other insectivorous African mammals such as aardvarks and elephant shrews, and even more distantly related to elephants and sirenians.

== Characteristics and affinities ==
Like most burrowing mammals with similar habits, the Chrysochloridae have short legs with powerful digging claws, very dense fur that repels dirt and moisture, and toughened skin, particularly on the head. The fur varies from black to pale yellow or grey, and has an iridescent sheen of green, blue, violet or copper when viewed in light.

Their eyes are non-functional and covered with furred skin. The external ears are just tiny openings. In particular, golden moles bear a remarkable resemblance to the marsupial moles of Australia, family Notoryctidae, which they resemble so suggestively that at one time, the marsupial/placental divide notwithstanding, some argued that they were related. Considerations that influenced the debate might have included the view that the Chrysochloridae are very primitive placentals and the fact that they have many mole-like specializations similar to specializations in marsupial moles.

The rhinarium is a greatly enlarged, dry leathery pad that protects their nostrils while the animal digs. In this respect, too, they resemble the marsupial moles. Some authors claim their primary sense is of touch, and they are particularly sensitive to vibrations, which may indicate approaching danger. Note below, however, the observations on the malleus in the middle ear.

The species range in size from about 8 centimetres (3.1 in) to about 20 centimetres (7.9 in). They have muscular shoulders and the forelimbs are radically adapted for digging; all the toes on the forefeet have been reduced, except for a large, pick-like third claw on the third toe. In comparison to true moles, the fifth digit is absent and the first and fourth digits are vestigial. The adaptations of the hind feet are less dramatic: They retain all five toes and are webbed as an adaptation to efficient backward shoveling of soil loosened by the front claws.

At one time, the Chrysochloridae were regarded as primitive. Supporting arguments of this included that they were thought to have originated in Gondwana, that they had a low resting metabolic rate, and that they could switch off thermoregulation when inactive. Like the tenrecs, they possess a cloaca, and males lack a scrotum. However, these points are no longer regarded as strongly suggestive of golden moles as undeveloped "reptilian mammals"; some are seen rather as adaptations to regional climatic conditions. Going into a torpor when resting or during cold weather enables them to conserve energy and reduce urgent requirements for food. Similarly, they have developed particularly efficient kidneys, and some species do not need to drink water at all. They tend to drown if they fall into water.

== Habits and ecology ==
Chrysochloridae are subterranean, afrotherian mammals endemic to sub-Saharan Africa, and most of which are recorded from South Africa in particular. Other regions include Lake Victoria, Western Cape, and Namibia. They live in a variety of environments; forest, swamps, deserts, or mountainous terrain. Chrysospalax species tend to forage above ground in leaf litter in forests or in meadows. Eremitalpa species such as Grant's golden mole live in the sandy Namib desert, where they cannot form tunnels because the sand collapses. Instead during the day, when they must seek shelter, they "swim" through the loose sand, using their broad claws to paddle, and dive down some 50 centimetres (20 in) to where it is bearably cool. There they enter a state of torpor, thus conserving energy. At night they emerge to forage on the surface rather than wasting energy shifting sand. Their main prey are termites that live under isolated grass clumps, and they might travel for 6 kilometres (3.7 mi) a night in search of food. They seek promising clumps by listening for wind-rustled grass-root stresses and termites' head-banging alarm signals, neither of which can be heard easily above ground, so they stop periodically and dip their heads under the sand to listen.

Most other species construct both foraging superficial burrows and deeper permanent burrows for residence. Residential burrows are relatively complex in form and may penetrate as far as 1 metre (3 ft 3 in) below ground and include deep chambers for use for refuge, and other chambers as latrines. They push excavated soil up to the surface, as in mole-hills, or compact it into the tunnel walls.

They feed on small insects and earthworms or small vertebrates such as lizards or burrowing snakes. They depend on their sense of hearing to locate much of their prey, and the cochleas of a number of golden mole species have been found to be long and highly coiled, which may indicate a greater ecological dependence on low frequency auditory cues than seen in Talpid moles.

== Morphology ==
Golden moles share a number of features, varying by species, seldom seen elsewhere among living mammals, including three forearm long-bones, hyoid-mandible articulation, and a hypertrophied malleus. Some species have hypertrophied (enlarged) middle ear ossicles, in particular the malleus. These animals have the largest malleus relative to body size of any animal. This morphology may be adapted for the detection of seismic signals. In this respect there is some apparent convergent evolution to burrowing reptiles in the family Amphisbaenidae.

== Reproduction ==
Females give birth to one to three hairless young in a grass-lined nest within the burrow system. Breeding occurs throughout the year. The adults are solitary, and their burrowing territory may be aggressively defended from intruders, especially where resources are relatively scarce.

== Status ==
Of the 21 species of golden mole, no fewer than 11 are threatened with extinction, the primary cause of which being human-induced habitat loss. Additionally sand mining, poor agricultural practices, and predation by domestic cats and dogs are causes of population decline.

== Classification ==
The taxonomy of the Chrysochloridae is undergoing a review in the light of new genetic information. They have traditionally been listed with the shrews, hedgehogs and a grab-bag of small, difficult-to-place creatures as part of the order Insectivora. Some authorities retain this classification, at least for the time being. Others group the golden moles with the tenrecs in a new order, which is sometimes known as Tenrecomorpha, while others call it Afrosoricida and reserve Tenrecomorpha for the family Tenrecidae.

- ORDER AFROSORICIDA
  - Suborder Tenrecomorpha
    - Family Tenrecidae: tenrecs, 34 species in 10 genera
  - Suborder Chrysochloridea
    - Family Chrysochloridae
      - Subfamily Chrysochlorinae
        - Genus Carpitalpa
          - Arends's golden mole (Carpitalpa arendsi)
        - Genus Chlorotalpa
          - Duthie's golden mole (Chlorotalpa duthieae)
          - Sclater's golden mole (Chlorotalpa sclateri)
        - Genus Chrysochloris
          - Subgenus Chrysochloris
            - Cape golden mole (Chrysochloris asiatica)
            - Visagie's golden mole (Chrysochloris visagiei)
          - Subgenus Kilimatalpa
            - Stuhlmann's golden mole (Chrysochloris stuhlmanni)
        - Genus Chrysospalax
          - Giant golden mole (Chrysospalax trevelyani)
          - Rough-haired golden mole (Chrysospalax villosus)
        - Genus Cryptochloris
          - De Winton's golden mole (Cryptochloris wintoni)
          - Van Zyl's golden mole (Cryptochloris zyli)
        - Genus Eremitalpa
          - Grant's golden mole (Eremitalpa granti)
      - Subfamily Amblysominae
        - Genus Amblysomus
          - Fynbos golden mole (Amblysomus corriae)
          - Hottentot golden mole (Amblysomus hottentotus)
          - Marley's golden mole (Amblysomus marleyi)
          - Robust golden mole (Amblysomus robustus)
          - Highveld golden mole (Amblysomus septentrionalis)
        - Genus Calcochloris
          - Subgenus Calcochloris
            - Yellow golden mole (Calcochloris obtusirostris)
          - Subgenus incertae sedis
            - Somali golden mole (Calcochloris tytonis)
        - Genus Huetia
          - Congo golden mole (Huetia leucorhina)
        - Genus Neamblysomus
          - Juliana's golden mole (Neamblysomus julianae)
          - Gunning's golden mole (Neamblysomus gunningi)
