= Somali golden mole =

Conservation status
- Data Deficient (IUCN 3.1)

Scientific classification
- Kingdom: Animalia
- Phylum: Chordata
- Class: Mammalia
- Order: Afrosoricida
- Family: Chrysochloridae
- Genus: Calcochloris
- Species: C. tytonis

Binomial name
- Calcochloris tytonis (Simonetta, 1968)
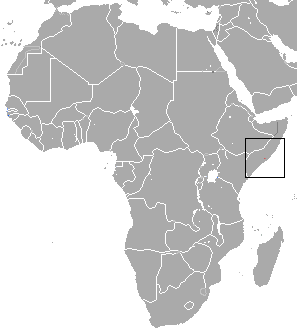
- Somali golden mole range

Synonyms
- Amblysomus tytonis Chlorotalpa tytonis

Species of mammal

The Somali golden mole (Calcochloris tytonis) is a golden mole endemic to Somalia. In 1964, Dr. Alberto Simonetta of the University of Florence discovered the mole's jaw and ear bone fragments in a barn owl pellet in Jowhar, Somalia. The Somali golden mole differs from the other species in its family (Chrysochloridae) because the shape of its jaw is distinct; although the length of the lower jaw fits within the size range of the skulls of species Amblysomus leucorhinus and Amblysomus sclateri, the width of the ascending parts of the jaw is much bigger (2mm) than that of the species it most closely matches (Amblysomus leucorhinus).
