= Chlorotalpa =

Scientific classification
- Domain: Eukaryota
- Kingdom: Animalia
- Phylum: Chordata
- Class: Mammalia
- Order: Afrosoricida
- Family: Chrysochloridae
- Subfamily: Chrysochlorinae
- Genus: Chlorotalpa; Roberts, 1924

Type species
- Chrysochloris duthieae Broom, 1907

Species
- Chlorotalpa duthieae; Chlorotalpa sclateri
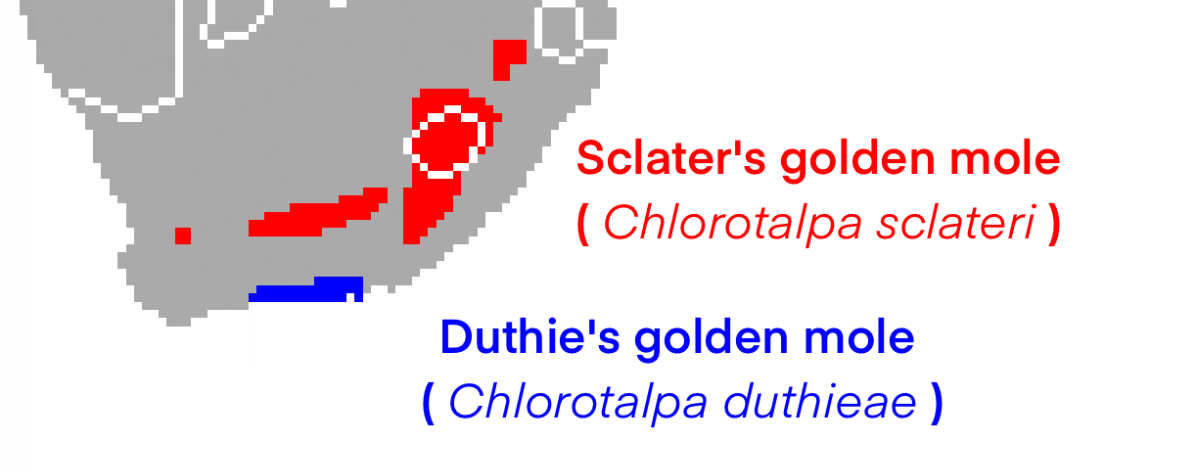

Genus of mammals

Chlorotalpa is a genus of mammal in the family Chrysochloridae. It contains the following species:

- Duthie's golden mole (Chlorotalpa duthieae)
- Sclater's golden mole (Chlorotalpa sclateri)
