= Cryptochloris =

Scientific classification
- Kingdom: Animalia
- Phylum: Chordata
- Class: Mammalia
- Order: Afrosoricida
- Family: Chrysochloridae
- Subfamily: Chrysochlorinae
- Genus: Cryptochloris; Shortridge & Carter, 1938

Type species
- Cryptochloris zyli Shortridge & Carter, 1938

Species
- Cryptochloris wintoni; Cryptochloris zyli
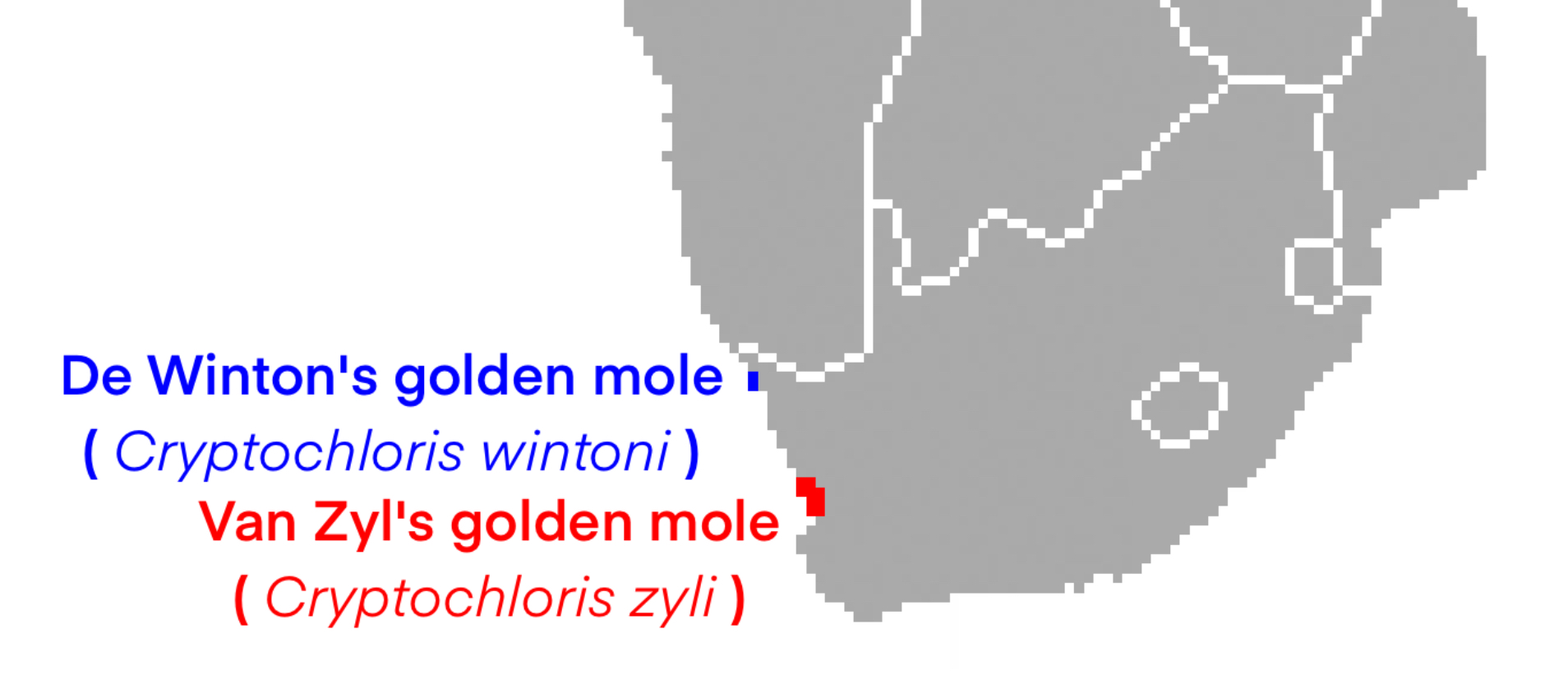

Genus of mammals

Cryptochloris is a genus of golden moles, containing the two species De Winton's golden mole (Cryptochloris wintoni) and Van Zyl's golden mole (Cryptochloris zyli).
