= Highveld golden mole =

Conservation status
- Near Threatened (IUCN 3.1)

Scientific classification
- Kingdom: Animalia
- Phylum: Chordata
- Class: Mammalia
- Order: Afrosoricida
- Family: Chrysochloridae
- Genus: Amblysomus
- Species: A. septentrionalis

Binomial name
- Amblysomus septentrionalis Roberts, 1913

Subspecies
- Amblysomus septentrionalis orangensis Amblysomus septentrionalis septentrionalis
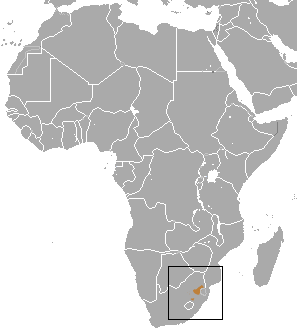
- Highveld golden mole range

Synonyms
- Amblysomus iris septentrionalis

Species of mammal

The highveld golden mole (Amblysomus septentrionalis) is a species of mammal in the golden mole family, Chrysochloridae. It is found in South Africa and Eswatini. Its natural habitats are forests, moist savanna, temperate shrubland and grassland, subtropical or tropical dry lowland grassland, arable land, pastureland, plantations, rural gardens, and urban areas.
