= Van Zyl's golden mole =

Conservation status
- Endangered (IUCN 3.1)

Scientific classification
- Kingdom: Animalia
- Phylum: Chordata
- Class: Mammalia
- Order: Afrosoricida
- Family: Chrysochloridae
- Genus: Cryptochloris
- Species: C. zyli

Binomial name
- Cryptochloris zyli Shortridge & Carter, 1938
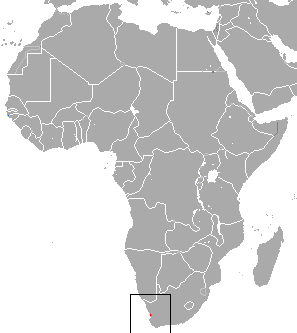
- Van Zyl's golden mole range

Species of mammal

Van Zyl's golden mole (Cryptochloris zyli) is a golden mole endemic to the Western Cape Province, South Africa. It is listed as an endangered species due to habitat loss. Golden moles are an ancient group of mammals who live mostly below ground. They have shiny coats of dense fur and a streamlined, formless appearance. They have no visible eyes or ears; in fact, they are blind – the small eyes are covered with hairy skin. The ears are small and are hidden in the animal's fur.

== Description ==
Van Zyl's golden mole is about 80–90 mm (3.1–3.5 in) long and weighs about 20–30 g (0.71–1.06 oz). The face has white markings.The dorsal fur is short and dense and is a dark lead-grey colour, the under-layer of fur being pale grey. The underparts are a uniform drab colour. The claw on the third digit on the forefoot is about 10 mm (0.4 in) long and 4 mm (0.2 in) wide at the base. Claws one and two are slightly shorter making a pointed digging tool.

== Ecology ==
It lives in the coastal dune belt and adjacent sandy areas. Usually two young are born, sometimes one. Van Zyl's golden mole eats various invertebrates, as well as legless lizards, which grow to a length of about 20 cm (8"). The young of golden moles are born in a grass-lined cavity in the ground. They usually dig their tunnels just below the ground.

== Status ==
Van Zyl's golden mole was initially known only from Compagnies Drift, 16 km (9.9 mi) inland from Lambert's Bay, northwestern Cape Province, South Africa. Another specimen was collected at Groenriviermond, approximately 150 km (93 mi) further north along the Namaqualand coast, in 2003. Van Zyl's golden mole is threatened by continued loss of habitat. For example, mining of coastal dunes for alluvial diamonds could lead to habitat degradation. Habitat alteration associated with tourism developments along the west coast could also pose a problem for this species. The International Union for Conservation of Nature now rates this species as "endangered".
