= Amblysomus =

Scientific classification
- Domain: Eukaryota
- Kingdom: Animalia
- Phylum: Chordata
- Class: Mammalia
- Order: Afrosoricida
- Family: Chrysochloridae
- Subfamily: Amblysominae
- Genus: Amblysomus; Pomel, 1848

Type species
- Chrysochloris hottentotus A. Smith, 1829

Species
- Amblysomus corriae; Amblysomus hottentotus; Amblysomus marleyi; Amblysomus robustus; Amblysomus septentrionalis
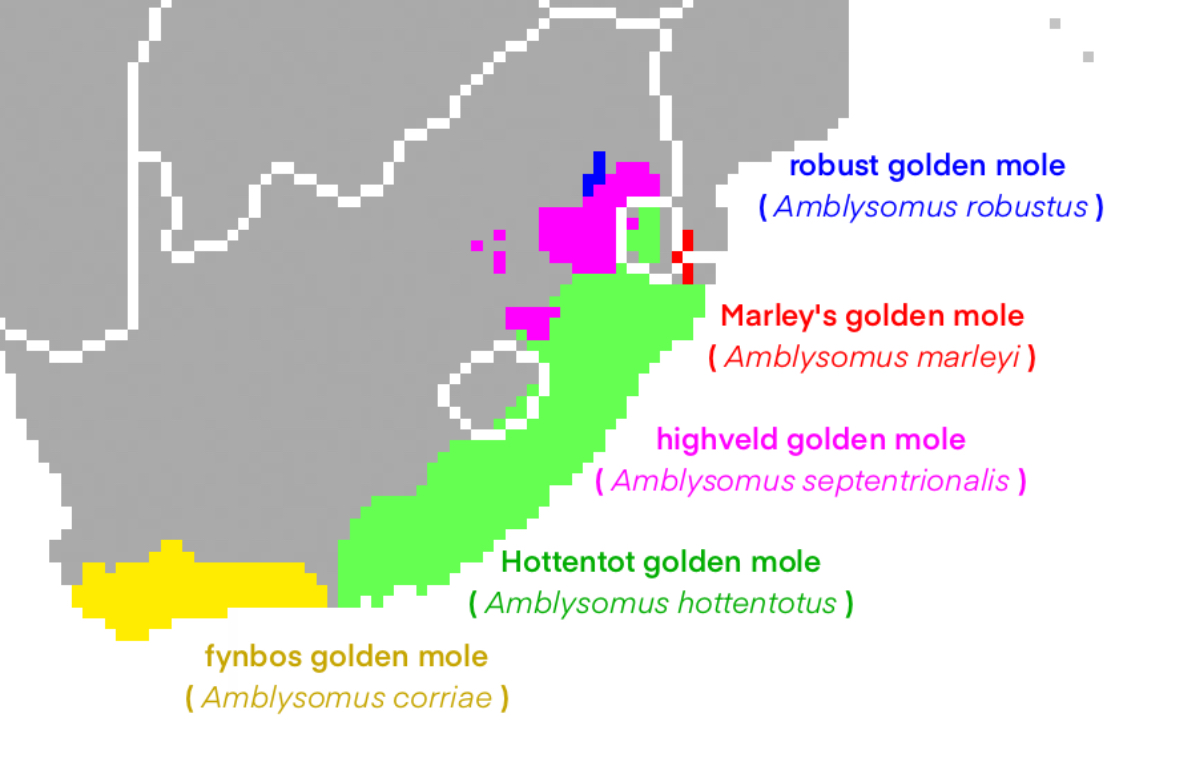

Genus of mammals

Amblysomus (also narrow-headed golden mole or South African golden mole) is a genus of the golden mole family, Chrysochloridae, comprising five species of the small, insect-eating, burrowing mammals endemic to Southern Africa. All five species can be found in South Africa and some are also found in Eswatini and Lesotho.

== Phylogeny ==
Amblysomus is part of the family of golden moles, Chrysochloridae. It contains the following species:

- Fynbos golden mole (Amblysomus corriae)
- Hottentot golden mole (Amblysomus hottentotus)
- Marley's golden mole (Amblysomus marleyi)
- Robust golden mole (Amblysomus robustus)
- Highveld golden mole (Amblysomus septentrionalis)

The order of golden moles and tenrecs, Afrosoricida, is part of Afrotheria, one of the four main divisions of placental mammals, along with elephant shrews, aardvarks, hyraxes, sirenians and elephants. Golden moles are not all golden. Some have black to pale tawny-yellow fur.; the name and family name “Chrysochloridae” (meaning green-gold), refers to the coppery gold, green, purple or bronze sheen of their dense fur.

== Description ==
They all have differences in size and color, but have a similar appearance” with compact fusiform or lozenge-shaped bodies, short and powerful forelimbs containing pick-like claws, and no external eyes, ears or tail”. Their fur consists of guard hairs that are moisture repellent. They have a woolly underfur for insulation. Their skin is thick and tough, especially on the head, containing a wedge-shaped muzzle with a leathery nosepad protecting its nostrils. upward thrust of their dorsally-flattened head and powerful down thrusts of the foreclaws help them tunnel through the soil during subsurface foraging. This creates raised visible ridges of soil. Genera Amblysomus and Neamblysomus use the head and webbed hind feet to move soil and evict it on the surface.

Similarities to fossorial mammals resulted from ecological convergence, not ancestry. The eyes are vestigial and that is why they are covered by skin. The optic nerve is degenerate because they live underground where there is little use of them. The external ear pinnae are absent as well as the external tail. The body has a streamlined shape which facilitates movement through dense substratum. On the outside, they are similar to other fossorial small mammals, but the golden moles show highly specialized characters like “a unique hyoid-dentary articulation. Some also have hypertrophied malleus bones in the middle ear that permits great sensitivity to underground vibrations and airborne sounds. They have a third bone in the forearm (i.e. ossified tendon) and a reduction of phalanges in the fore- and hindfeet. Muscle arrangements are not paralleled in the Mammalia. Most anatomical specializations shown in extant species are found in 3 fossil species (dating back to the Miocene). Chrysochlorids have been described as "spectacularly autapomorphic" due to how unusual and numerous they are.

They are blind, subterranean small mammals with small ears, tails and eyes that are all covered by skin and fur. They have unique cranial and nasal morphology. On their nose is a large leathery pad to help them burrow. They have powerful forearms and claws, but use mainly their snout to burrow. The golden mole thrusts its forearms from under its body to help it burrow deeper into the earth.

Both the male and female have a cloaca. They have tabulars in the occipital which is not found in other mammals. Their zygomatic arches form elongations of the maxillae. Their malleus is enlarged and helps in hearing under the ground. Golden moles do not have a fifth finger on their front paws. Instead, they have a huge claw on the third or second finger. Their fur has an iridescent sheen.

Their dental formula is 3,1,3,2/3,1,3,2. The first incisor is enlarged. The lateral incisors and first premolars are like canines. The molars are zalmbdodont (have v-shaped crest) like tenrecs. Zalambdodonty has arisen independently. This implies that it is due to morphological convergence, because they are not closely allied to any other family of extant mammals.

Studies show that tenrecs and golden moles should be separated from Insectivora and placed in Afrotheria which include the elephant shrews and hyraxes. They share few morphological synapomorphies. Mitochondrial/nuclear gene sequences and rare genomic changes demonstrated that chrysochlorids and tenrecs form their own clade, Afrosoricida (African shrew-like mammals). It contains no soricids (shrews) and is sometimes confused with the shrew subgenus Afrosorex. Alternative names were "Tenrecoidea" and "Tenrecomorpha”. Divergence between golden-moles and tenrecs occurred about 50 million years ago. They are now classified as Chrysochloridea instead of a specialized members of Order Insectivora.

== Natural history ==
Golden moles are common throughout southern Africa. There are 7 genera and 18 species known. They resemble the Talpidae (true moles) and Notoryctidae (marsupial moles). Two subfamilies may be recognized: the Chrysochlorinae, in which the malleus bone of the middle ear is enlarged with a spherical or club-like shape and the Amblysominae, in which the malleus is not expanded and has the typical mammalian shape (i.e. Amblysomus).

All 21 species of golden moles are endemic to subSaharan Africa. They inhabit a wide altitudinal, climatic and vegetational spectrum of subterrestrial habitats. The highest diversity is found in southern Africa. Only three species occur outside the region (i.e. Calcochloris leucorhinus; Chrysochloris; and Calcochloris tytonis). The South African species fall into two ecological groups: semi-desert (Eremitalpa granti, Cryptochloris zyli and C. wintoni), karroid (Chrysochloris visagiei) or fynbos habitats (Chrysochloris asiatica) along the south-west coast; and indigenous forests, savanna woodlands and temperate grasslands in the eastern part of the subregion (Chrysospalax, Chlorotalpa, Calcochloris, Neamblysomus and Amblysomus).

Only the Hottentot golden mole (Amblysomus hottentotus) and the Cape golden mole (Chrysochloris asiatica) are widespread. The Stuhlmann's golden mole (Chrysochloris stuhlmanni) and Juliana's golden mole Neamblysomus julianae), are known from scattered localities situated hundreds of kilometres apart, but connected by continuous favourable habitat. These may be more widespread than is indicated by the scant distribution data currently available. Other species, such as Sclater's golden mole (Chlorotalpa sclateri), probably have more restricted ranges than general texts indicate, since the few populations known to exist occur at localities separated by wide expanses of seemingly inhospitable habitat. Geographical continuity between these isolates seems unlikely.

Despite a high thermal conductance, the golden mole has a low basal metabolic rate. They reduce their thermoregulatory energy requirements and enter torpor, (i.e. either daily or in the cold). Body temperature in the thermal neutral zone is lower than in other small mammals. Efficient renal function effectively reduces water requirements so that they do not need to drink. Specializations allow them to survive in extreme habitats and where food is seasonally or perennially scarce.

Most golden mole species are restricted to a narrow range of habitats and environmental conditions. They have very limited mobility and dispersal abilities. They are specialized K-selected strategists, opportunistic insectivores. They eat primarily invertebrates they find. They feed on earthworms, termites and millipedes. Their diets may vary due to the abundance of prey items.

Most are solitary and subterrestrial. They construct semi-permanent tunnel systems. Their tunnels consists of an upper tier of burrows used for foraging and a lower tier with inter-connecting chambers used for resting and raising young (except the Namib (Eremitalpa granti namibensis) who “swims" through the desert in search for termite nests.

Populations of golden moles are restricted to patches of habitat with friable soils and abundant invertebrates. Their distribution is clumped and sympatric. Different species rarely coexist to compete for resources. If two species occur in the same area they tend to occupy different microhabitats due to ecological displacement.

In courtship the male chirrups, bobs his head and stomps his foot and the female rasps and squeals. Reproductive data suggests that golden moles breed throughout the year, but peaks in the wetter months when food is more abundant. Some think they are polyoestrous. Litter sizes are usually 2. Post-natal development reaches up to 45.

The behavior of all golden moles is primarily solitary and territorial. They live in deserts and swamps. The Golden mole digs and lives in burrows. Territorial golden moles fight viciously when confined together. Studies show that small groups may hibernate together, but only in the giant golden mole. Burrows used by more than one mole. The Hottentot golden mole will fight aggressively with either sex by using their foreclaws to wrestle, and biting at the abdomen. Fighting is accompanied by high-pitched squeaks. The golden mole actively defends its burrow systems range overlap, and the dominant mole take over neighbouring burrows to increase its home range.

The IUCN Red List of Threatened Species includes 10 South African golden mole species. The De Winton's golden mole (Cryptochloris wintoni) is critically endangered. Marley's golden mole (Amblysomus marleyi), Giant golden mole (Chrysospalax trevelyani), Van Zyl's golden mole (Cryptochloris zyli), Gunning's golden mole (Neamblysomus gunningi), and Juliana's golden mole (Neamblysomus julianae) are endangered. The topotypical population of Juliana's golden mole is critically endangered. Robust golden mole (Amblysomus robustus), Arend's golden mole (Carpitalpa arendsi), Duthie's golden mole (Chlorotalpa duthieae), Rough-haired golden mole (Chrysospalax villosus) are vulnerable. Grant's golden mole (Eremitalpa granti), Fynbos golden mole (Amblysomus corriae), and Highveld golden mole (Amblysomus septentrionalis) are near threatened. Congo golden mole (Calcochloris leucorhinus) Somali golden mole (Calcochloris tytonis), Visagie's golden mole (Chrysochloris visagiei) are listed as Data Deficient.

Threatened species have restricted or fragmented distributions. Populations subjected to habitat degradation due to human activities like mining, urbanization, agriculture and the poor forest management. Husbandry projects have been conducted on the Golden mole. This included captivity for a few weeks up to nearly two years. Individuals were housed separately in containers of rich soil/sand. They were fed daily with insects and earthworms. Water was provided ad libitum because they do not drink in the wild. Some get pinky mice and frozen day-old chicks (Bronner) Room temperature is okay, but not below 15 °C or above 30 °C. This range does not disrupt their endogenous torpor rhythms. Torpor reduces the amount of food intake. DO not handle them as they sleep. They will awaken and the stress will cause them to stop eating and physiological decline others.

== Research review ==
The question of higher-level relationships among placental mammal centers on the order Inserctivora. Huxley argued that insectivores retain many primitive features. They are closer to their ancestor mammals than the living groups. Cladistic analysis suggests that living insectivores are “united by derived anatomical features”. Insectivores are not monophyletic, golden moles included. This clade also includes hyraxes, manatees, elephants, elephant shrews and aardvarks. They are from an African origin. Suggested from 12S ribosomal RNA transversions, African radiation came from a single common ancestor and gave rise to divergence during Cretaceous period. This is before the land connections were developed with Europe in the early Cenozoic era.

The middle ear of nine families of golden moles (family Chrysochloridae) were examined to see the ossicular apparatus. The Amblysomus species have ossicles typical of mammals. The Chrysospalax, Chrysochloris, Cryptochloris and Eremitalpa species do not. They ”have enormously hypertrophied mallei. Golden moles differ in the nature and extent of the interbullar connection, the shape of the tympanic membrane and that of the manubrium. The stapes has an unusual orientation, projecting dorsomedially from the incus. It has been proposed that hypertrophied ossicles in golden moles are adapted towards the detection of seismic vibrations. The functional morphology of the middle ear apparatus is reconsidered in this light, and it is proposed that adaptations towards low-frequency airborne hearing might have predisposed golden moles towards the evolution of seismic sensitivity through inertial bone conduction. The morphology of the middle ear apparatus sheds little light on the disputed ordinal position of the Chrysochloridae.”

Abstract: The densities of middle ear ossicles of golden moles (family Chrysochloridae, order Afrosoricida) were measured using the buoyancy method. The internal structure of the malleus was examined by high-resolution computed tomography, and solid-state NMR was used to determine relative phosphorus content. The malleus density of the desert golden mole Eremitalpa granti (2.44 g/cm3) was found to be higher than that reported in the literature for any other terrestrial mammal, whereas the ossicles of other golden mole species are not unusually dense. The increased density in Eremitalpa mallei is apparently related both to a relative paucity of internal vascularization and to a high level of mineralization. This high density is expected to augment inertial bone conduction, used for the detection of seismic vibrations, while limiting the skull modifications needed to accommodate the disproportionately large malleus. The mallei of the two subspecies of E. granti, E. g. granti and E. g. namibensis, were found to differ considerably from one another in both size and shape.

Not so long ago, there was a lot of uncertainty regarding how clades of living mammals were interrelated. Many mammalian systematists believed that golden moles (Chrysochloridae) were “insectivorans” along with shrews and hedgehogs. It appears in most studies as the sister taxon to Tenrecidae-Chrysochloridae-Macroscelididae, but has also been placed as sister taxon to Chrysochloridae, Tenrecidae, or to a macroscelidid-chrysochlorid clade. Relatedly, tenrecids and chrysochlorids are generally reconstructed as sister taxa, except for those studies just noted. Different resolutions of intra-afrotherian phylogeny, particularly the intriguing possibility that tenrecids, chrysochlorids, and macroscelidids are more basal than paenungulates have important implications for understanding the afrotherian common ancestor as occupying either an ungulate- or insectivoran-grade niche. The quality of the fossil record of some afrotherian lineages, such as proboscideans, hyracoids and sirenians, is relatively good, and while that of other afrotherians is much poorer, it too is benefiting from a steady pace of discovery. ... Afrotheria (paenungulates, aardvarks, tenrecs, golden moles) comprising a single clade (Atlantogenata) at the base of Placentalia, and with all other placentals in the clade Boreoeutheria, has received relatively consistent support since 2007. Hence, there now is good phylogenetic reason to scrutinize a major division within Placentalia: afrotherians and xenarthrans (“southern” placentals) on the one hand, and boreoeutherians (“northern” placentals) on the other. For example, Leche argued that in tenrecs and golden moles, “der Zahnwechsel in eine sehr späte Lebensphase fällt” (“tooth replacement occurs in a very late period of life”) based on the observation that individuals of adult size retain deciduous teeth and/or have not yet erupted their permanent successors”.
