= Neamblysomus =

Scientific classification
- Domain: Eukaryota
- Kingdom: Animalia
- Phylum: Chordata
- Class: Mammalia
- Order: Afrosoricida
- Family: Chrysochloridae
- Subfamily: Amblysominae
- Genus: Neamblysomus; Roberts, 1924

Type species
- Chrysochloris gunningi Broom, 1908

Species
- N. gunningi; N. julianae
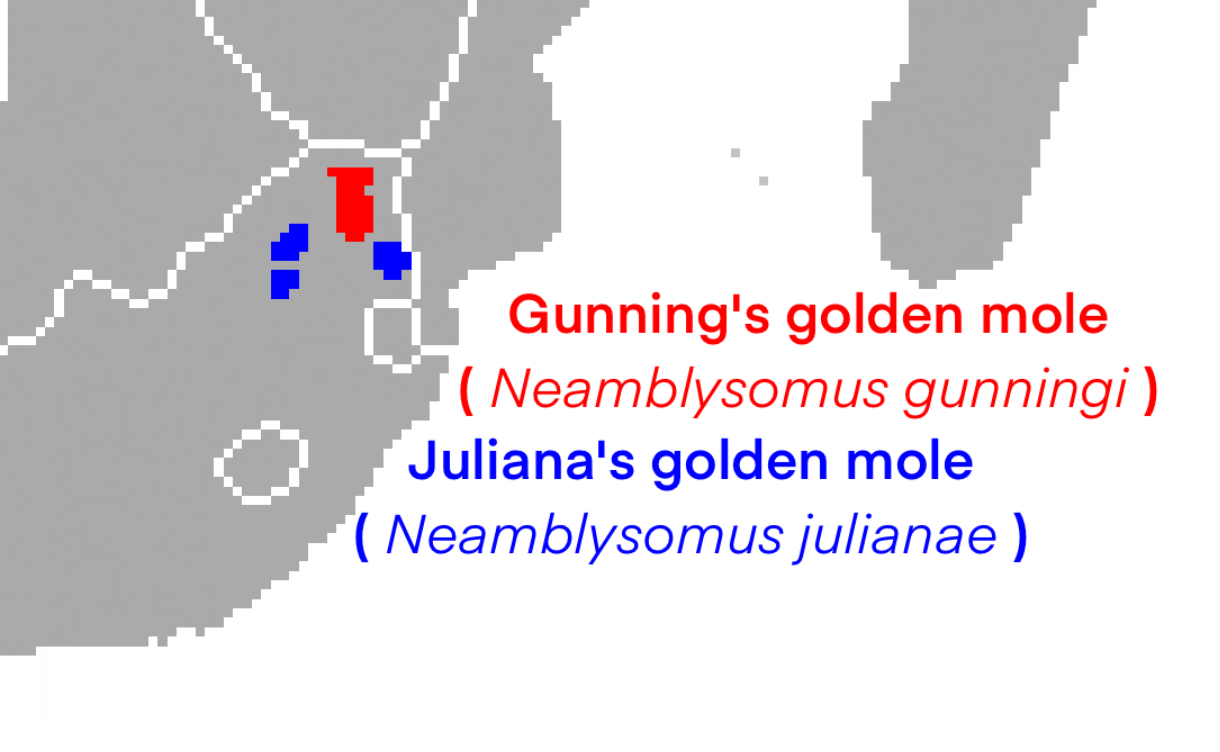

Genus of mammals

Neamblysomus is a genus of golden moles containing two species:

- Gunning's golden mole (Neamblysomus gunningi)
- Juliana's golden mole (Neamblysomus julianae)
