= Duthie's golden mole =

Conservation status
- Vulnerable (IUCN 3.1)

Scientific classification
- Kingdom: Animalia
- Phylum: Chordata
- Class: Mammalia
- Order: Afrosoricida
- Family: Chrysochloridae
- Genus: Chlorotalpa
- Species: C. duthieae

Binomial name
- Chlorotalpa duthieae (Broom, 1907)
- Duthie's golden mole range Extant (resident)
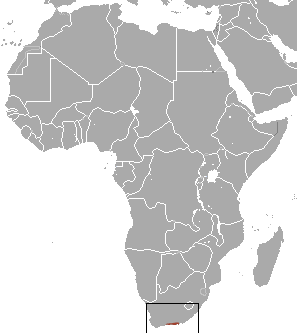

Synonyms
- Amblysomus duthieae Chlorotalpa sclateri duthieae

South African mammal

Duthie's golden mole (Chlorotalpa duthieae) is a species of mammal in the family Chrysochloridae. It is endemic to South Africa. Its natural habitats are subtropical or tropical moist lowland forests, moist savanna, temperate grassland, arable land, pastureland, plantations, rural gardens, and urban area. The specific name duthieae was given in honour of Dr. Augusta Vera Duthie, a South African botanist.

== Description ==
Duthie's golden mole has a head-and-body length of between 100 and 130 mm (3.9 and 5.1 in), with a short tail averaging 12 mm (0.5 in). The upper parts are a lustrous reddish-black or brownish-black, while the underparts are greyish. There are pale markings on the muzzle and around the eyes. Males tend to be larger than females.

== Distribution and habitat ==
Duthie's golden mole is endemic to South Africa where it only occurs in a coastal strip about 275 km (170 mi) in length to the west of Port Elizabeth. There are two separate populations; the eastern population is in the environs of Port Elizabeth where it occurs in pasture, agricultural land and gardens. The western and larger population is between Wilderness and Tsitsikamma, where it occurs in Southern Afrotemperate Forests, largely located within national parks. The mole favours areas of sandy loam and alluvial sands.

== Ecology ==
This mole digs an underground nest under the base of a tree, and creates shallow passages radiating out into the surrounding area. It forages, mainly at night, in these tunnels and in the leaf litter, feeding mainly on earthworms. Little is known of the animal's breeding habits, but one female was recorded as being pregnant in the spring (November) with a litter of two young. The barn owl is a predator of this species.

== Status ==
This mole is fairly common in suitable habitats. The main threat it faces is from destruction of its habitat by coastal development and urbanization, which may lead to populations being further fragmented. Other threats include predation by domestic cats and dogs, persecution by gardeners and farmers, timber felling and replacement of native forests by plantation crops. For these reasons, the International Union for Conservation of Nature has assessed its conservation status as being "vulnerable".
