= Gunning's golden mole =

Conservation status
- Endangered (IUCN 3.1)

Scientific classification
- Kingdom: Animalia
- Phylum: Chordata
- Class: Mammalia
- Order: Afrosoricida
- Family: Chrysochloridae
- Genus: Neamblysomus
- Species: N. gunningi

Binomial name
- Neamblysomus gunningi (Broom, 1908)
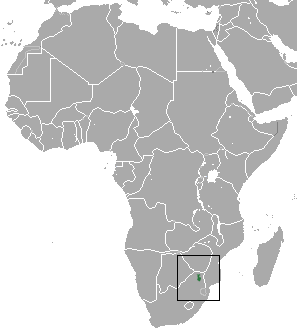
- Gunning's golden mole range

Synonyms
- Amblysomus gunningi

Species of mammal

Gunning's golden mole (Neamblysomus gunningi) is a small mammal endemic to South Africa. It was listed in 2006 as an endangered species. Its decreasing numbers are due to habitat clearance or destruction and predation from domesticated cats and dogs. It is a burrowing animal and spends the majority of its time underground.

== Characteristics ==
The upper parts are a dark golden-brown tinged with a slight iridescence and the underparts are a lighter brown with a golden sheen. It has a compact, streamlined body and a wedge-shaped head and pointed muzzle. It has muscular shoulders, short powerful forelimbs and strong digging claws. The third claw is enlarged and there is no fifth digit and only a vestigial first and fourth digit. The hind feet retain all five toes and are webbed to allow efficient backward shoveling of the soil loosened with the front claws. The ears are buried in the dense fur and the vestigial eyes are covered by hairy skin. The length is between 11 and 13 centimetres (4.3 and 5.1 in). Males weigh 56–70 grams (2.0–2.5 oz) and females 39–56 grams (1.4–2.0 oz).

== Biology ==
Golden moles have a high metabolic rate and are able to enter into a state of torpor in response to cold temperatures. This enables them to survive in areas where temperatures can be low and food scarce. When burrowing and foraging near the surface they create raised ridges of soil that are visible above ground. There is also a system of deeper tunnels which are used for resting and for the rearing of young. The diet is mostly earthworms, insect larvae and other small invertebrates.

== Range and habitat ==
The golden mole is known only from the far northern Drakensberg, at Woodbush Forest and New Agatha Forest Reserve, Limpopo Province, South Africa, where it inhabits montane forest and grasslands, cultivated farmland and young pine plantations. It prefers moist soil near watercourses and ponds. Because of this limited range it is vulnerable to any detrimental human activities within the area and its status is given as an endangered species in the IUCN Red List.
