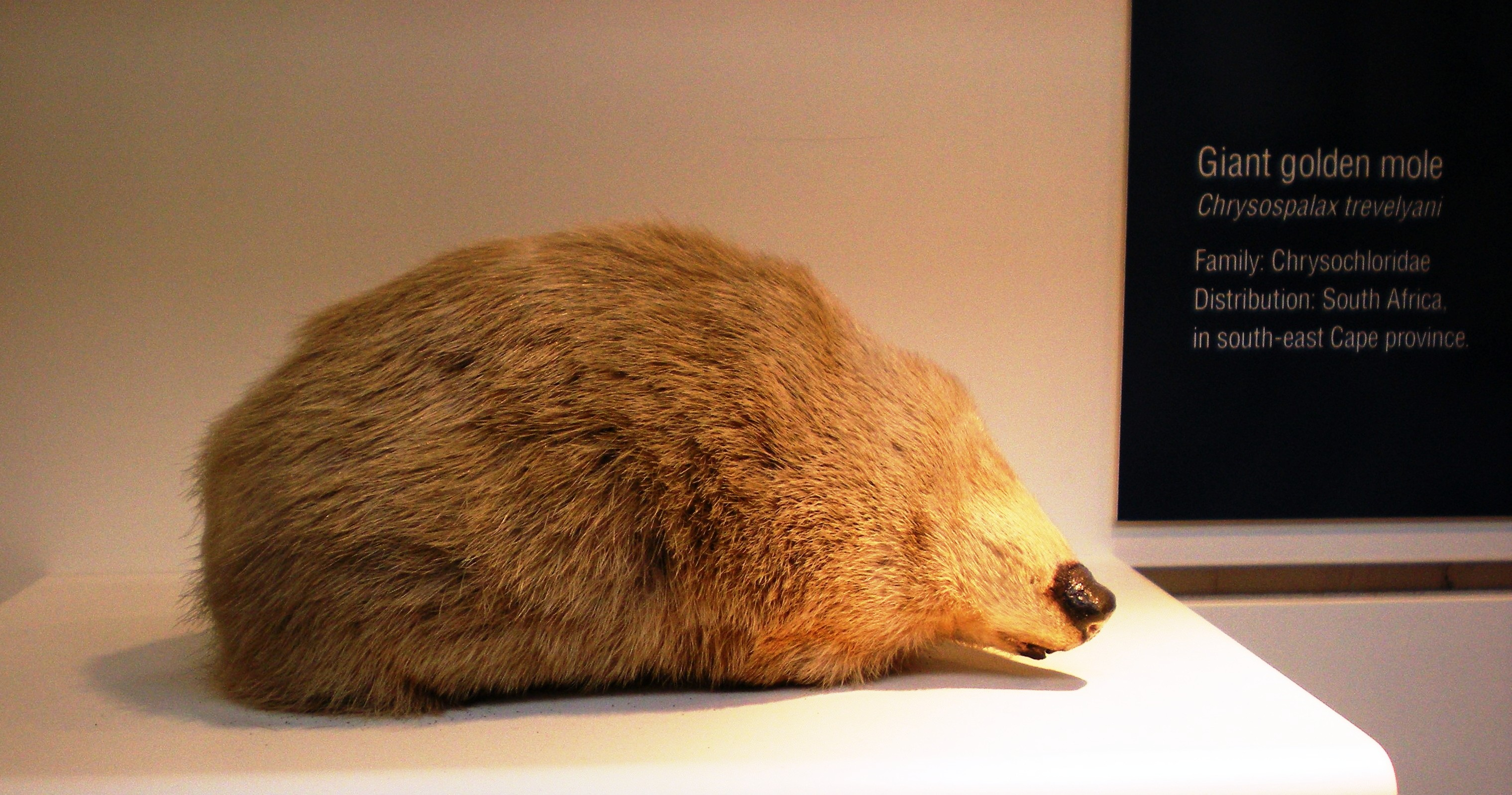
- Giant golden mole (Chrysospalax trevelyani)

Scientific classification
- Domain: Eukaryota
- Kingdom: Animalia
- Phylum: Chordata
- Class: Mammalia
- Order: Afrosoricida
- Family: Chrysochloridae
- Subfamily: Chrysochlorinae
- Genus: Chrysospalax; Gill, 1883

Type species
- Chrysochloris trevelyani Günther, 1875

Species
- C. villosus; C. trevelyani
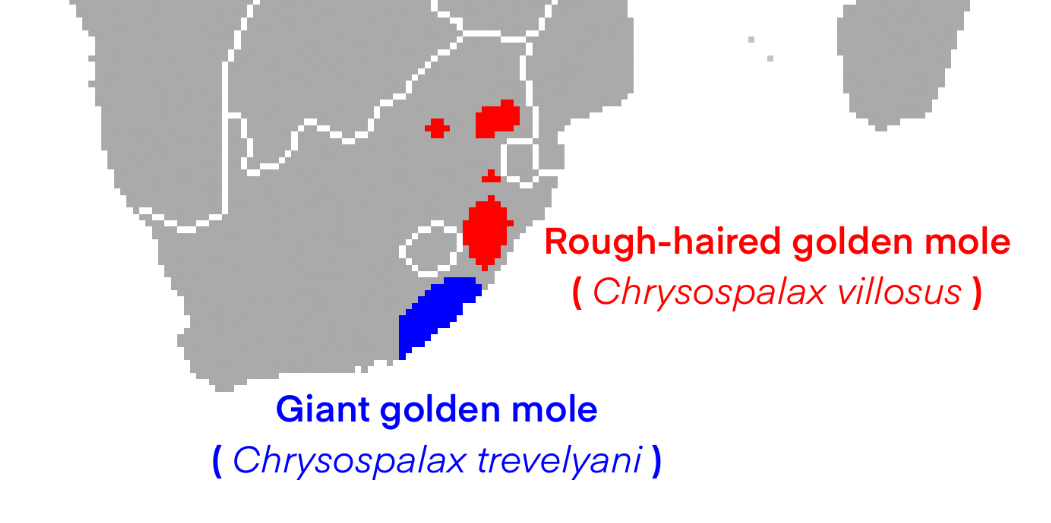

= Chrysospalax =

Genus of mammals

Chrysospalax is a small genus of mammal in the family Chrysochloridae. The two members are endemic to South Africa. It contains the following species:

- Rough-haired golden mole (Chrysospalax villosus)
- Giant golden mole (Chrysospalax trevelyani)
