= Fynbos golden mole =

Conservation status
- Near Threatened (IUCN 3.1)

Scientific classification
- Kingdom: Animalia
- Phylum: Chordata
- Class: Mammalia
- Order: Afrosoricida
- Family: Chrysochloridae
- Genus: Amblysomus
- Species: A. corriae

Binomial name
- Amblysomus corriae Thomas, 1905

Subspecies
- Amblysomus corriae corriae Amblysomus corriae devilliersi
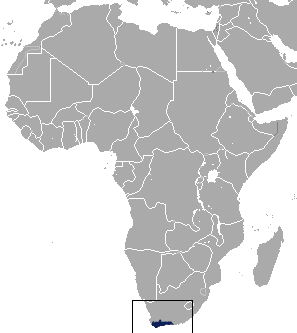
- Fynbos golden mole range

Synonyms
- Amblysomus hottentotus devilliersi; Amblysomus iris corriae

Species of mammal

The fynbos golden mole (Amblysomus corriae) is a species of mammal in the golden mole family, Chrysochloridae. It is endemic to South Africa.

Its natural habitats are fynbos vegetation, temperate forests, shrubland, and grassland, subtropical or tropical lowland moist forest and dry grassland, moist savanna, sandy shores, arable land, pastureland, plantations, rural gardens, and urban areas.

== See also ==
- Biodiversity of Cape Town
- Index: Fynbos - habitats and species.
