= Marley's golden mole =

Conservation status
- Endangered (IUCN 3.1)

Scientific classification
- Kingdom: Animalia
- Phylum: Chordata
- Class: Mammalia
- Order: Afrosoricida
- Family: Chrysochloridae
- Genus: Amblysomus
- Species: A. marleyi

Binomial name
- Amblysomus marleyi Roberts, 1931
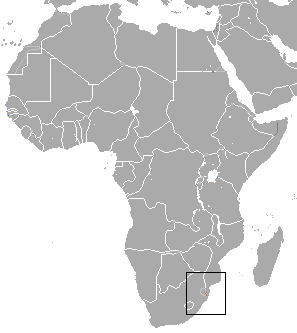
- Marley's golden mole range

Synonyms
- Amblysomus hottentotus marleyi

Species of mammal

Marley's golden mole (Amblysomus marleyi) is a species of burrowing mammal in the golden mole family, Chrysochloridae. It is found in South Africa and possibly Eswatini. It has been separated from Amblysomus hottentotus by Bronner (1995b, 1996, 2000). Its natural habitat is indigenous forests and moist grassland, and also gardens. It is classified as Endangered in the IUCN Red List of Threatened Species. The main threats it faces are habitat degradation, either through overgrazing by cattle or the removal of vegetation for firewood, and urbanization.

== Characteristics ==
Marley's golden mole has a compact, streamlined body, a wedge-shaped head, pointed muzzle and sleek, moisture repellent fur. The upper parts are a dark reddish-brown and the underparts range from dull brown to orange-brown. It has muscular shoulders with short powerful forelimbs and strong digging claws. The third claw is enlarged and there is no fifth digit and only a vestigial first and fourth digit. The hind limbs retain all five toes which are webbed to allow for efficient backward shoveling of soil that has been loosened by the forelimbs. It has no external ears or tail and the vestigial eyes are covered by hairy skin. The weight is 30–34 g (1.1–1.2 oz).

== Biology ==
When burrowing and foraging near the surface, this mole creates raised ridges of soil that are visible above ground. There is also a system of deeper tunnels with chambers which are used for resting and for the rearing of young. The diet is not known precisely but earthworms, insect larvae and other invertebrates are likely to predominate. Golden moles have a low metabolic rate and are able to enter into a state of torpor in response to cold temperatures. This enables them to survive in areas where temperatures can be low and food scarce.

== Range and habitat ==
This species is known from only two isolated localities on the eastern slopes of the Lebombo Mountains in KwaZulu-Natal, South Africa. It may be more widespread than this as remains of the species have been identified in owl pellets 250 km (160 mi) to the southwest of its known range. It is mainly found in indigenous forests and moist grassland but also sometimes in gardens. The main threats it faces are from habitat degradation.
