= Robust golden mole =

Conservation status
- Vulnerable (IUCN 3.1)

Scientific classification
- Kingdom: Animalia
- Phylum: Chordata
- Class: Mammalia
- Order: Afrosoricida
- Family: Chrysochloridae
- Genus: Amblysomus
- Species: A. robustus

Binomial name
- Amblysomus robustus Bronner, 2000
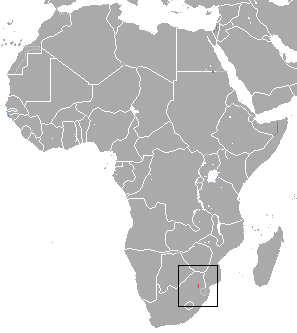
- Robust golden mole range

Synonyms
- Amblysomus hottentotus robustus

Species of mammal

The robust golden mole (Amblysomus robustus) is a species of mammal in the golden mole family, Chrysochloridae. It is endemic to parts of Mpumalanga province in South Africa. Its natural habitats are temperate forests, subtropical or tropical moist lowland forest, temperate and subtropical or tropical dry shrubland, dry lowland grassland, arable land, pastureland, plantations, rural gardens, and urban areas.
