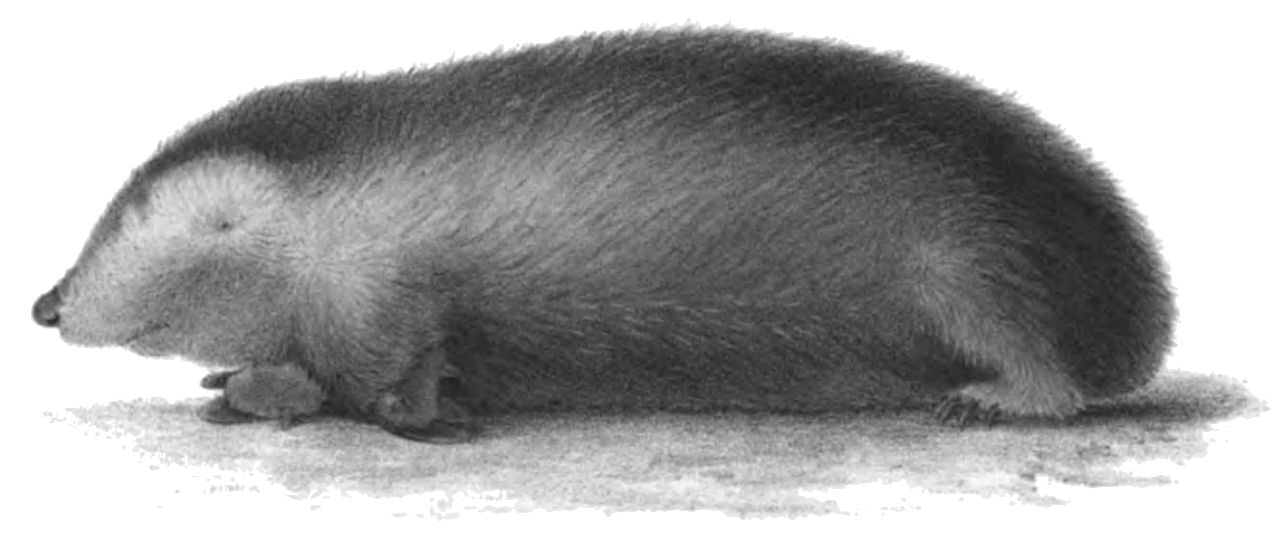

Conservation status
- Least Concern (IUCN 3.1)

Scientific classification
- Kingdom: Animalia
- Phylum: Chordata
- Class: Mammalia
- Order: Afrosoricida
- Family: Chrysochloridae
- Genus: Calcochloris
- Species: C. obtusirostris

Binomial name
- Calcochloris obtusirostris (Peters, 1851)
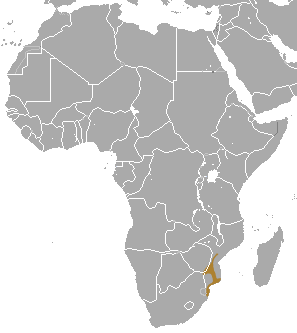
- Yellow golden mole range

Synonyms
- Calcochloris antedates Chrysotricha obtusirostris Huetia obtusirostris

= Yellow golden mole =

Species of mammal

The yellow golden mole (Calcochloris obtusirostris) is a species of mammal in the family Chrysochloridae. It is found in Mozambique, South Africa (KwaZulu-natal and the Limpopo), and Zimbabwe. The yellow golden mole's natural habitats are subtropical or tropical dry and moist lowland forests, savanna, arable land, pasture, plantations, and rural gardens.

The C. o. chrysillus subspecies occurs in coastal forests, savannas and northern KwaZulu-natal. All species of Calcochloris live close to human settlements and thrive in urban gardens and rural places.

Yellow golden moles are likely to dig at the base of trees and create underground "nest" in which they forage for food. Its diet mainly consists of insects, small lizards, flies, and other tiny animals found underground.

== Conservation status ==
This species has been classified by the IUCN Red List as LC (Least Concern) globally, but the population trend is unknown. However, the Endangered Wildlife Trust of South Africa regards it as a Near-threatened species.

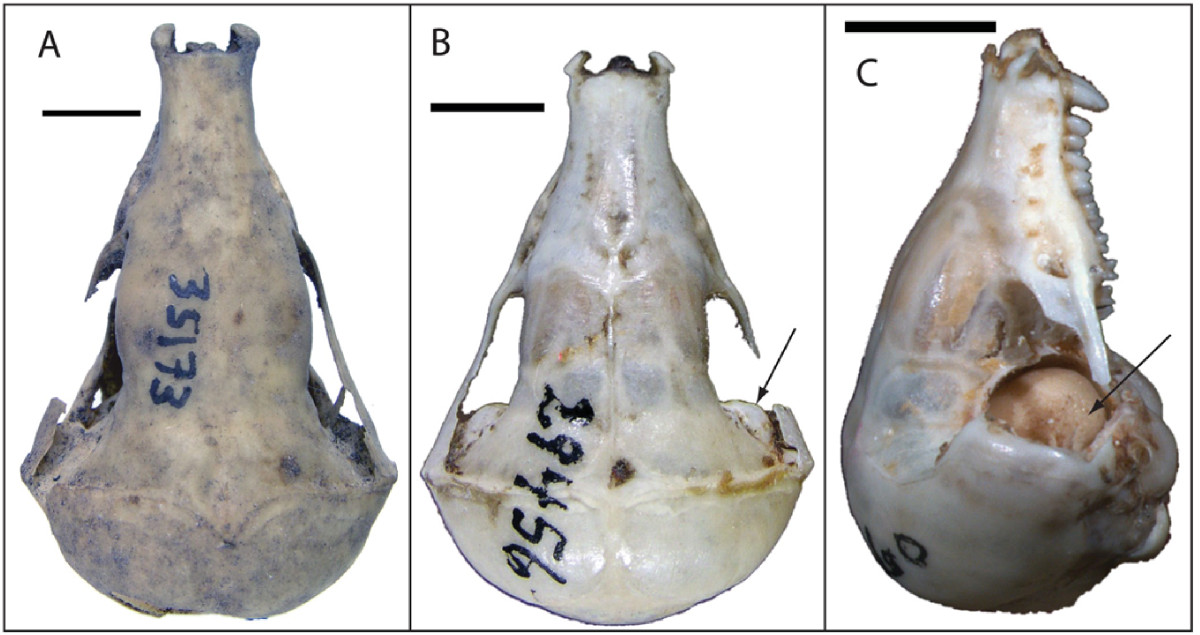
Skulls of three Calcochloris species
