= Sclater's golden mole =

Conservation status
- Least Concern (IUCN 3.1)

Scientific classification
- Kingdom: Animalia
- Phylum: Chordata
- Class: Mammalia
- Order: Afrosoricida
- Family: Chrysochloridae
- Genus: Chlorotalpa
- Species: C. sclateri

Binomial name
- Chlorotalpa sclateri (Broom, 1907)

Subspecies
- Chlorotalpa sclateri guillarmodi Chlorotalpa sclateri montana Chlorotalpa sclateri sclateri Chlorotalpa sclateri shortridgei
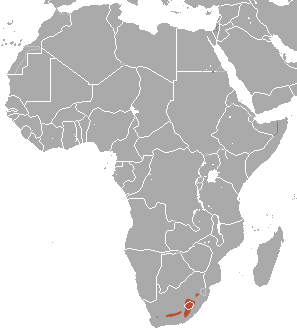
- Sclater's golden mole range

Synonyms
- Amblysomus sclateri

Species of mammal

Sclater's golden mole (Chlorotalpa sclateri) is a species of mammal in the family Chrysochloridae. It is found in Lesotho and South Africa. Its natural habitats are subtropical or tropical dry and high-altitude shrubland, Mediterranean-type shrubby vegetation, temperate grassland, arable land, pastureland, rural gardens, and urban areas. This species is locally common, and the International Union for Conservation of Nature has assessed its conservation status as being of "least concern".

== Description ==
This is a small, stocky golden mole, growing to a head-and-body length of about 100 mm (3.94 in), males being slightly larger than females. The chin and face have creamy-yellow markings, including over the sub-dermal eyes and across the bridge of the nose. The upper parts are clad in glossy, reddish-brown fur with a darker streak running along the spine. The underparts are dull grey with a reddish tinge. The forefeet are slender, and there is no tail.

== Distribution and habitat ==
Sclater's golden mole is endemic to southern Africa where it is found in South Africa and Lesotho. Its typical habitat is grasslands at high elevation, scrubland and forested kloofs. There are four subspecies, but the range of each is poorly understood, and they are generally delineated by geographical barriers.

== Ecology ==
Adult Sclater's golden moles are generally solitary. The slender claws restrict it to soils in which tunnels can be easily dug. A central nesting tunnel is surrounded by long, shallow tunnels in which it forages for invertebrate prey, particularly earthworms and grubs. Breeding takes place in the wet season (December and January) at which time food is more abundant.
