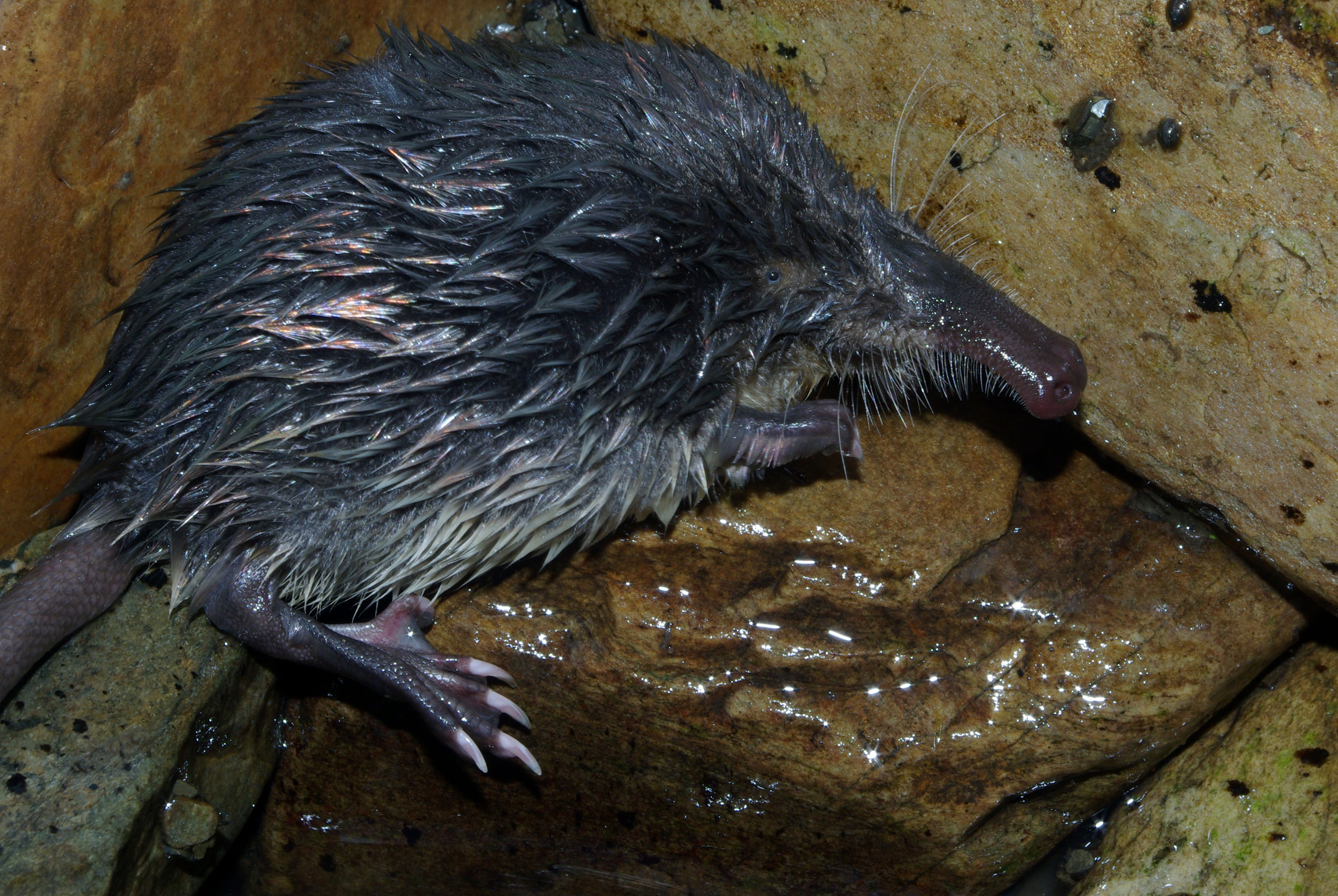

Conservation status
- Endangered (IUCN 3.1)

Scientific classification
- Kingdom: Animalia
- Phylum: Chordata
- Class: Mammalia
- Order: Eulipotyphla
- Family: Talpidae
- Genus: Galemys
- Species: G. pyrenaicus

Binomial name
- Galemys pyrenaicus (É. Geoffroy, 1811)
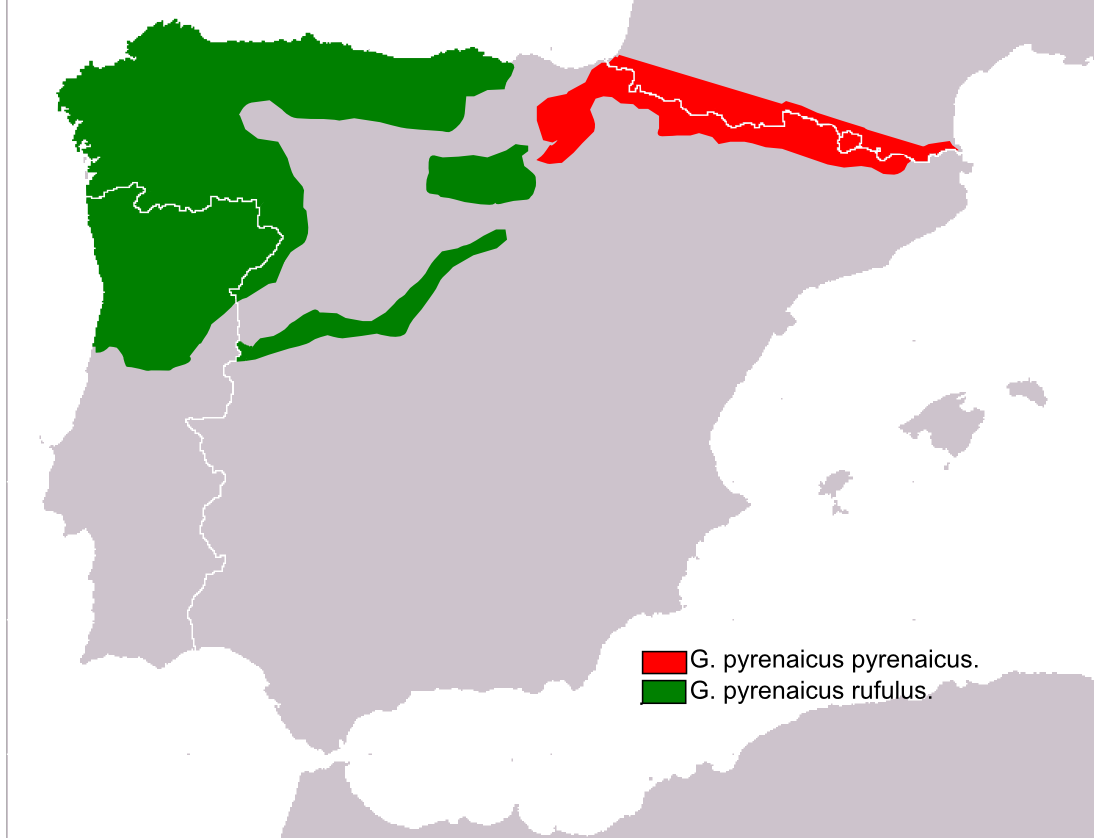
- Galemys pyrenaicus pyrenaicus Galemys pyrenaicus rufulus

= Pyrenean desman =

Species of mammal

The Pyrenean desman (Galemys pyrenaicus), also known as the Iberian desman or trumpet rat, is a species of small semiaquatic mammal in the family Talpidae. It is endemic to the mountain ranges of the Pyrenees and to mountainous areas of the northwestern Iberian Peninsula, primarily the Cantabrian Mountains and the Sistema Central. Its distribution includes four European countries: Andorra, Spain, France, and Portugal. The species is closely related to the Russian desman.

The Pyrenean desman shows anatomical features that resemble those of several other mammals, including the brown rat (notably a robust tail adapted for swimming), the European mole (with strong, clawed forelimbs and a sensitive snout), and the common shrew (with an elongated snout used to capture small arthropods). The distinctive trunk-like snout gives rise to the alternative name "trumpet rat". The species has very limited vision and relies primarily on a highly developed sense of touch for orientation and foraging. Its mobile, prehensile snout bears vibrissae at the base and Eimer's organs at the tip, specialized tactile structures.

The desman is an insectivorous semi-aquatic species that inhabits mountain lakes and fast-flowing streams with clear water. Its diet consists mainly of aquatic larvae that are sensitive to pollution, including larvae of stoneflies, caddisflies, and mayflies. The species is primarily nocturnal and avoids human presence, which makes direct observation difficult. Several aspects of its biology, including details of its reproductive cycle, remain insufficiently documented.

The Pyrenean desman is restricted to unaltered and unpolluted watercourses and is therefore considered a reliable bioindicator of aquatic environmental quality. It is particularly sensitive to anthropization of its habitat: the construction of dams, the armouring of riverbanks with rock, and the building of barrages lead to habitat loss and fragmentation. Since 2021, the species has been classified as Endangered by the International Union for Conservation of Nature across its entire range, with populations continuing to decline despite conservation measures implemented since the early 21st century.

Historically, the desman was often regarded as a pest by local communities, particularly by fishermen and fish farmers, largely due to limited understanding of its ecology and diet. From the 1990s onward, this perception began to change as scientific research increased. In the early 21st century, the species occupies a paradoxical position: although it remains little known to the general public and faces a high risk of extinction, it has become an emblematic animal of the Pyrenean region and appears with increasing frequency in regional cultural expressions.

== Description ==
=== General anatomy ===
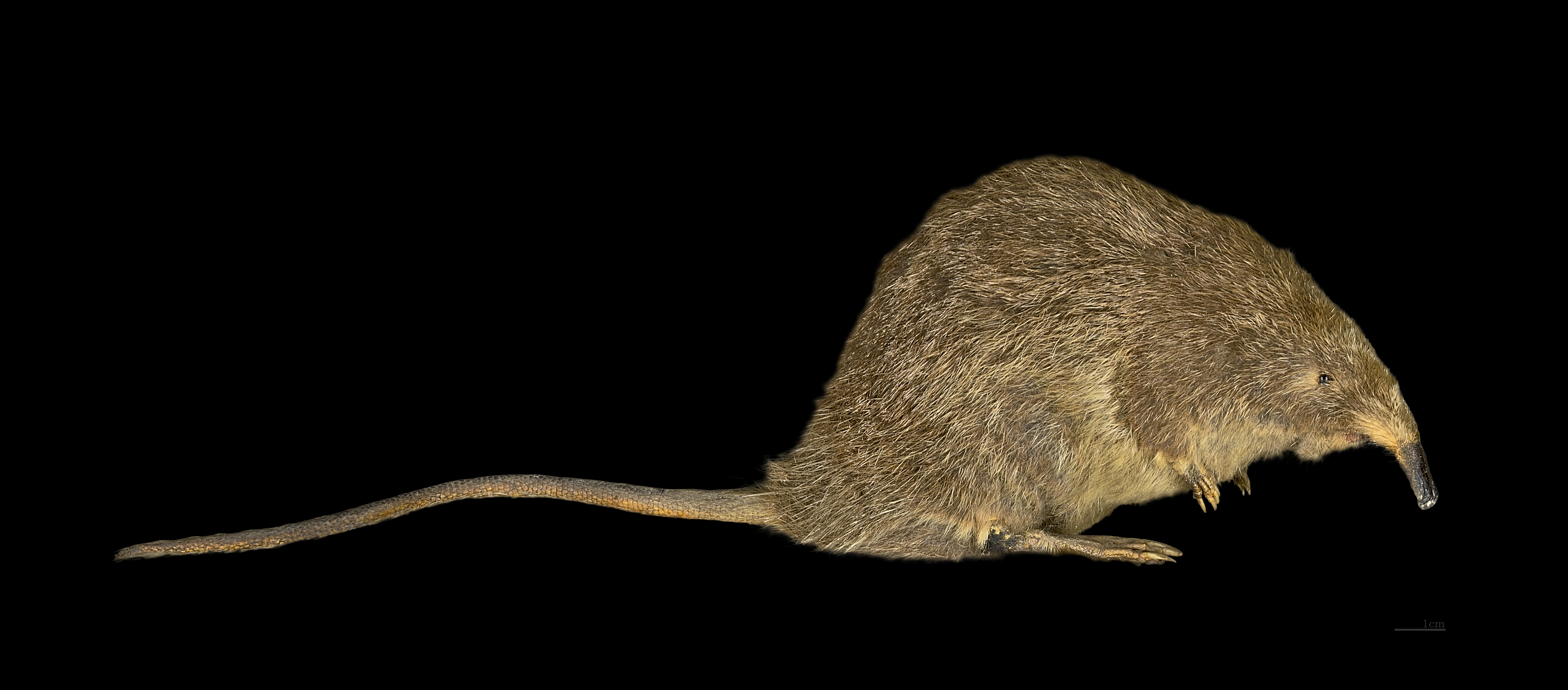
Body length of the Pyrenean desman compared to its tail (Muséum de Toulouse).

The Pyrenean desman measures approximately 25 cm (9.8 in) in total length, more than half of which is accounted for by the tail, and has a body mass of 50 to 60 g (2.1 oz). There is no pronounced sexual dimorphism; females are on average slightly larger than males. Reliable sex determination generally requires close examination of the external genitalia.

The species has webbed hind feet, a relatively uncommon adaptation among insectivorous mammals, which is one of the characteristics supporting its placement in a monotypic genus. The genus Galemys includes only this single species. Comparable adaptations are otherwise found only in Limnogale, the Ruwenzori otter shrew, and the elegant water shrew.

In other respects, the morphology of the Pyrenean desman combines features found in several more familiar mammals:

- from the brown rat, it shares robust hindquarters, well-developed thighs, and a long, thick tail that facilitates locomotion in aquatic environments;
- from moles, it has powerful, clawed forelimbs adapted for digging burrows used for shelter and rearing young, as well as a snout with a highly developed tactile capacity;
- from the common shrew, it shows a prehensile trunk and prominent vibrissae, which are used to detect prey larvae and to orient within its surroundings.

The dentition comprises 44 teeth, arranged according to the dental formula 3.1.4.3 in both the upper and lower jaws. This complete dentition corresponds to that observed in European moles. The two anterior upper incisors are particularly developed. The first premolar, considered supernumerary, is interpreted as a deciduous tooth that has become permanent.

=== Adaptations ===
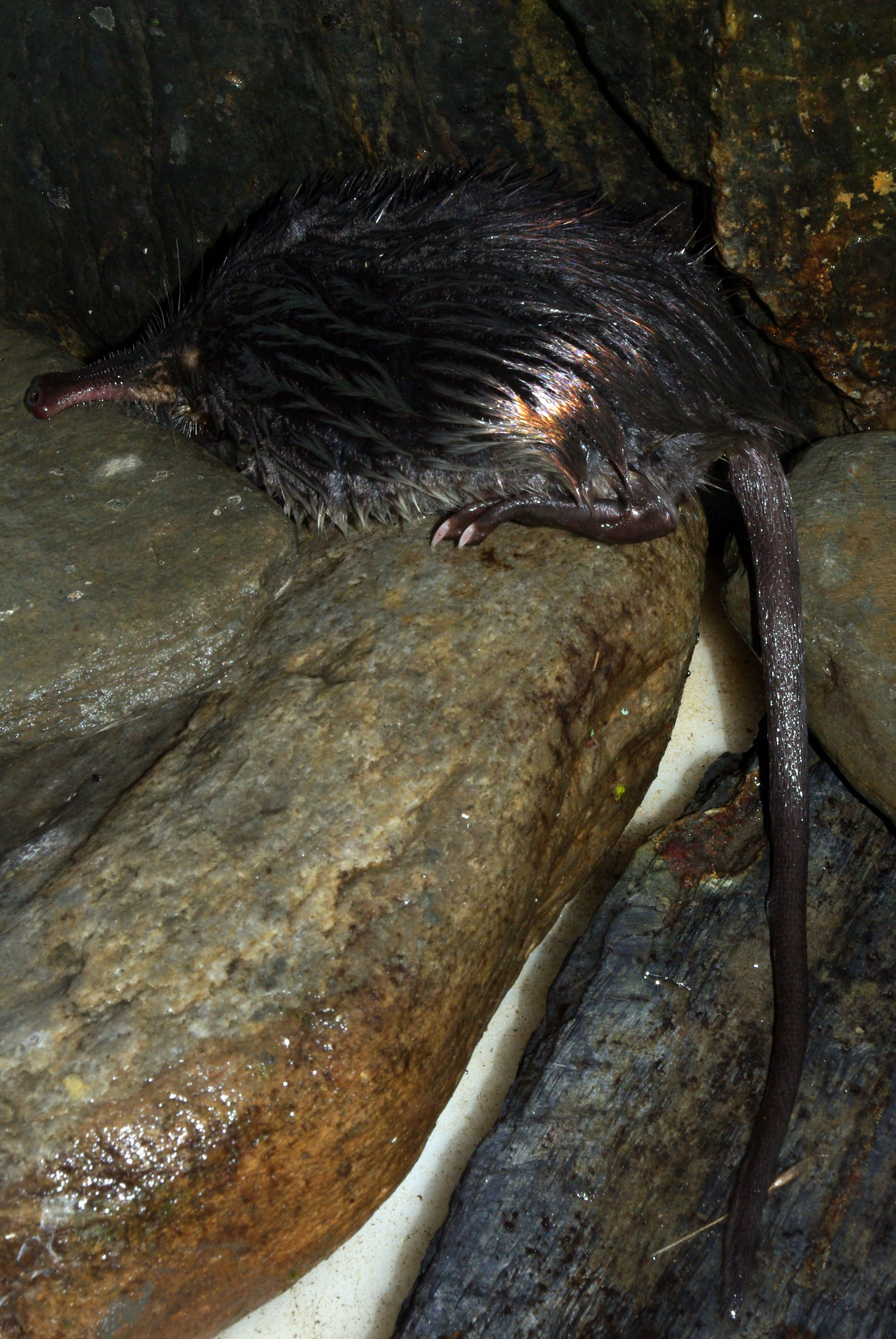
Shiny, scaly appearance of the fur when wet.

On land, the Pyrenean desman has a rounded, stocky body. The fur is grey-brown, with silvery reflections on the underside and a tawny coloration in the pectoral region. The hairs are arranged in small tufts that can give a scaly appearance. Regular grooming with an oily secretion produced by abdominal glands ensures a high degree of waterproofing. The fur is therefore well adapted to an aquatic lifestyle and underwater diving. It is composed of two layers: a dense, silky underfur that remains dry, and an outer layer of long, flattened guard hairs of varying length. When submerged, this structure forms a smooth surface that retains body heat by trapping a layer of insulating air. This trapped air also increases buoyancy, in accordance with Archimedes' principle, requiring the animal to remain in constant motion underwater to avoid surfacing, which increases energy expenditure and partially offsets the insulating effect.

In water, which constitutes its primary habitat, the body assumes a streamlined profile. The forelimbs are held close to the body, while the robust, webbed hind feet are spread at an angle of about 45 degrees and function as paddles; they are equipped with sharp claws that facilitate gripping onto rocks. During dives, which typically last around twenty seconds, valves close the nostrils. The Pyrenean desman is an agile and powerful swimmer, capable of rapid movement in water and of swimming upstream, including at the surface.

The eyes are visible but partly concealed by the fur. As in most members of the family Talpidae, vision is poorly developed, and the animal is able to distinguish little more than variations in light intensity. The ears lack external pinnae and are entirely hidden beneath the fur, consisting only of a circular opening measuring approximately 2 to 4 mm (0.079 to 0.157 in) in diameter.

The tail extends from the posterior of the body and is broad at the base, gradually tapering toward the tip, which bears a small tuft of white hairs. At the base of the tail and on the ventral surface are two musk glands, whose swelling is readily apparent.

=== Trunk ===
At the anterior end of the body is the desman's most distinctive structure: an enlarged proboscis that is hairy at the base and otherwise bare, measuring about 2.5 cm (0.98 in) in length and accounting for roughly one quarter of the animal's body length. This proboscis is flexible and prehensile, and divides distally into two lobes that contain the nostrils. As in the elephant, it results from the evolutionary fusion of the nose and the upper lip.

The proboscis constitutes the desman's principal sensory organ and, like that of moles, is among the most highly specialized tactile structures in mammals. It is used to detect prey underwater and to explore both aquatic and terrestrial environments. Sensory perception is mediated, first, by vibrissae at the base of the proboscis, which detect nearby and distant vibrations and movements. Second, the terminal lobes are covered with hundreds of thousands of Eimer's organs, whose high sensitivity enables the detection of prey within stream substrates. In addition, the vomeronasal organ (Jacobson's organ) is thought to contribute to the chemical detection of prey. This organ is located at the entrance of the nasal cavities, which communicate with the oral cavity via the palate. Its development is associated with a highly sensitive sense of smell, allowing the detection of larvae at distances of up to 5 cm (2.0 in) underwater. The vomeronasal organ is the sole olfactory system in fish and amphibians and is also present during embryonic development in mammals, including humans; in most mammals, its function is reduced after birth as olfactory perception becomes primarily mediated by the nasal conchae located deeper within the nasal cavities.

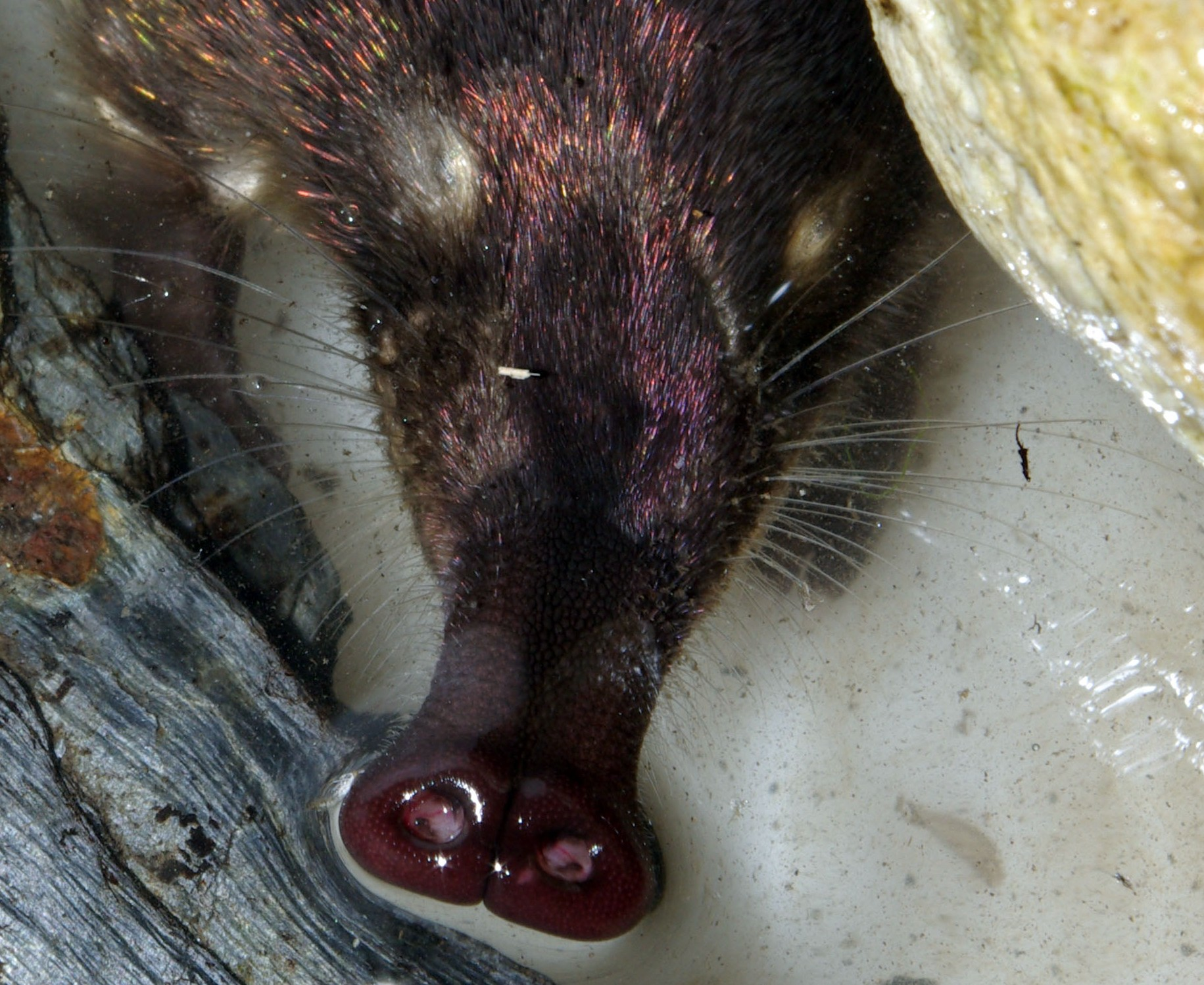
Detail of the trunk with sensory organs such as vibrissae and papillae housing Eimer's organs.

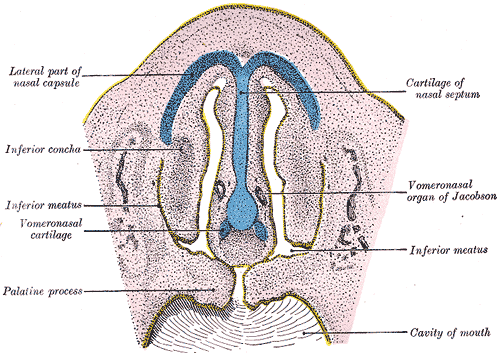
Section of the nasal cavity of a human embryo. The vomeronasal organ (Jacobson's organ) is identified on the right. This organ is vestigial in humans but highly developed in some species like the desman.

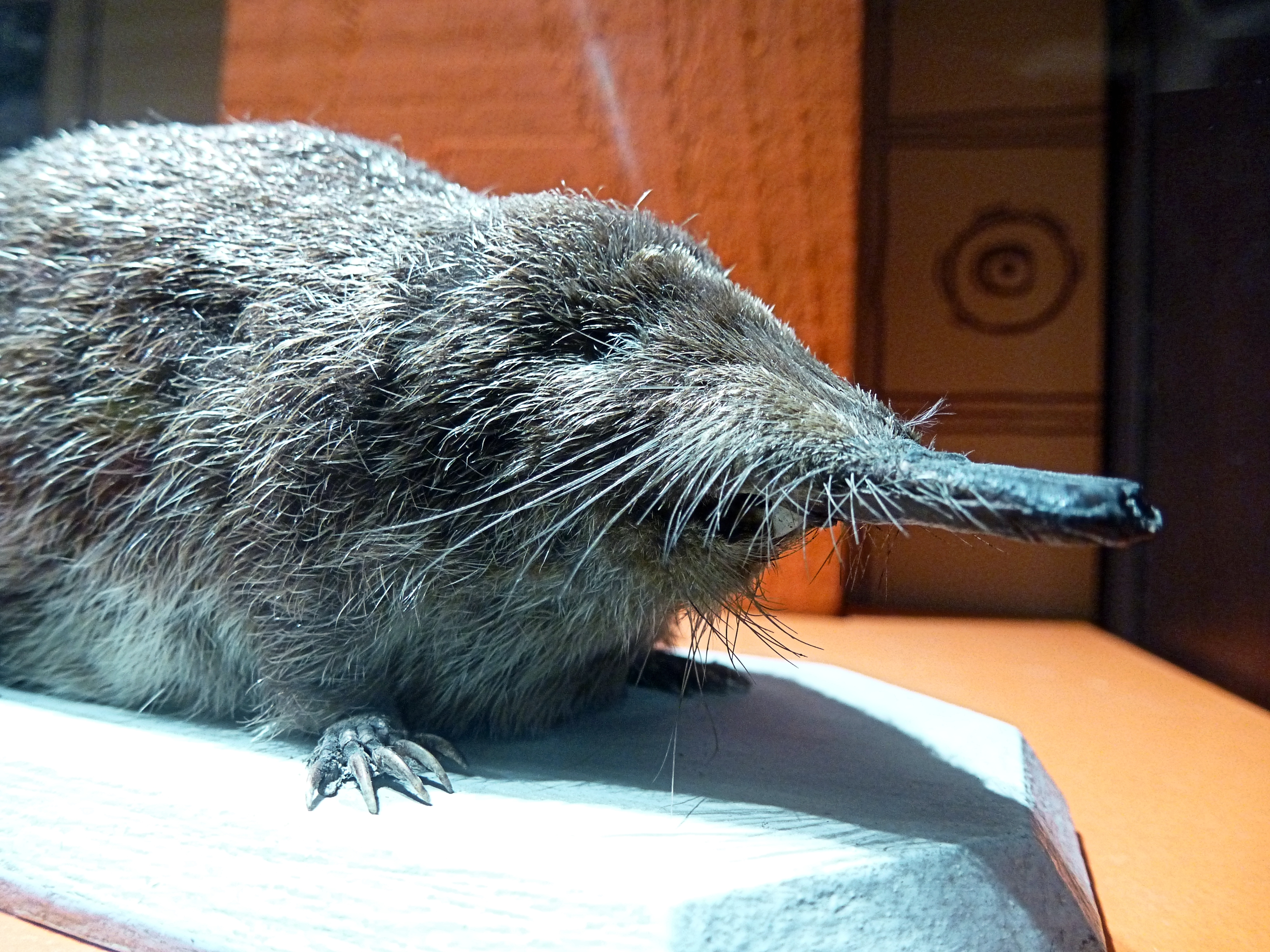
Vibrissae at the base of the trunk and clawed forelegs are clearly visible. Taxidermy specimen, MNHN.

=== Cognitive abilities ===
Scientific studies indicate that the Pyrenean desman exhibits well-developed spatial memory and orientation abilities relative to other mammals of comparable size. Individuals are able to retain information about the geometry of frequently used paths, as well as the olfactory and gustatory characteristics of their home range. Post-mortem examinations have shown that the cerebellum, a brain region involved in spatial coordination and orientation, is proportionally well developed in this species when compared with many other mammals. In particular, the cerebellum of the Pyrenean desman is larger than that of the mole or the Russian desman and, in proportional terms, is approached only by that of cetaceans.

Experimental observations further suggest that the desman is capable of discriminating, through tactile perception, between geometric forms, surface textures, and degrees of granularity. It can also recognize familiar shapes when they are rotated or presented from different orientations. These abilities imply the integration of tactile sensitivity with higher-order cognitive functions, including memory, three-dimensional shape processing, and spatial orientation.

=== Feces ===
The feces of the Pyrenean desman are distinctive in appearance. They consist of small, twisted cylindrical pellets measuring approximately 10–15 mm (0.39–0.59 in) in length, with an oily texture and a colour ranging from dark green to black. They also emit a musky odour that is generally not readily identifiable by the human sense of smell.

Feces are most commonly deposited on rocks above the waterline. They act as a substrate for secretions from the musk glands and are thought to play a role in territorial marking and in the exchange of information between individuals.

== Habitat and distribution ==
=== Geographic range ===
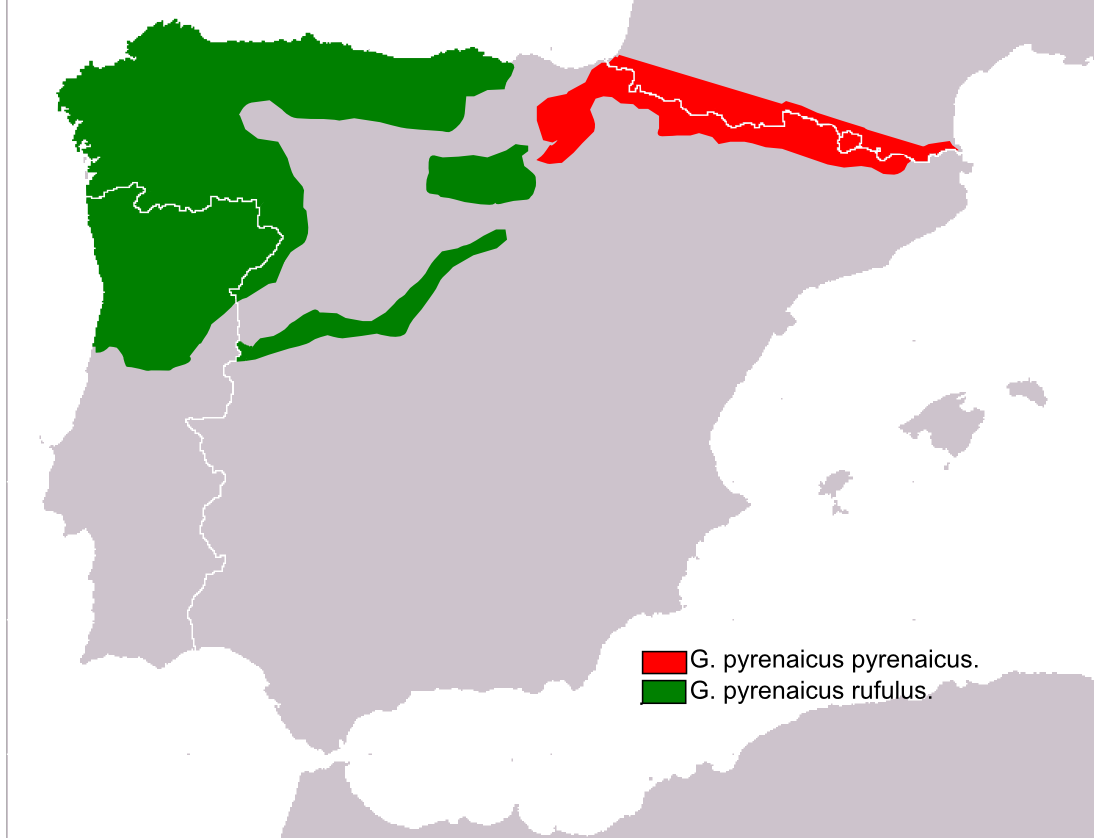
Distribution of the two subspecies of Galemys pyrenaicus: Galemys pyrenaicus pyrenaicus Galemys pyrenaicus rufulus

The Pyrenean desman is an endemic species of mountainous regions of the Pyrenees, the Cantabrian Mountains, and the Iberian Sistema Central. It occurs primarily along specific rivers and their tributaries (listed from north to south and from west to east):

- France: Nivelle, Nive, Gave d'Aspe, Gave d'Ossau, Adour, Neste, Pique, Garonne, Hers-Vif, Salat, Arize, Ariège, Aude, Rébenty, Agly, Têt, and Tech;
- Spain: Bidasoa, Leitzaran, Deba, Artibai, Lea, Gobelas, Oka, Auritz, Irati, Aragon, Gállego, sierra de Guara, Ara, Cinca, Noguera Ribagorçana, Noguera Pallaresa, Segre, Ter, Oviedo, Pisuerga, Xallas, Tambre, Lérez, Oitavén, Sil, Tâmega, Arandilla, Duero;
- Portugal: Minho, Rio Âncora, Lima, Neiva, Cávado River, Ave, Rio Leça, Douro, Vouga, Mondego, Zêzere.

Many of these rivers are separated by continental divides or belong to distinct and non-contiguous drainage basins; as a result, the species' distribution is highly fragmented.

At a broad scale, the current range is considered a remnant of post-glacial expansion into newly available habitats, facilitated by terrestrial corridors and possibly a denser river network during the Holocene. At a finer scale, however, movements between neighbouring drainage basins may have occurred more recently.

=== Habitat type ===
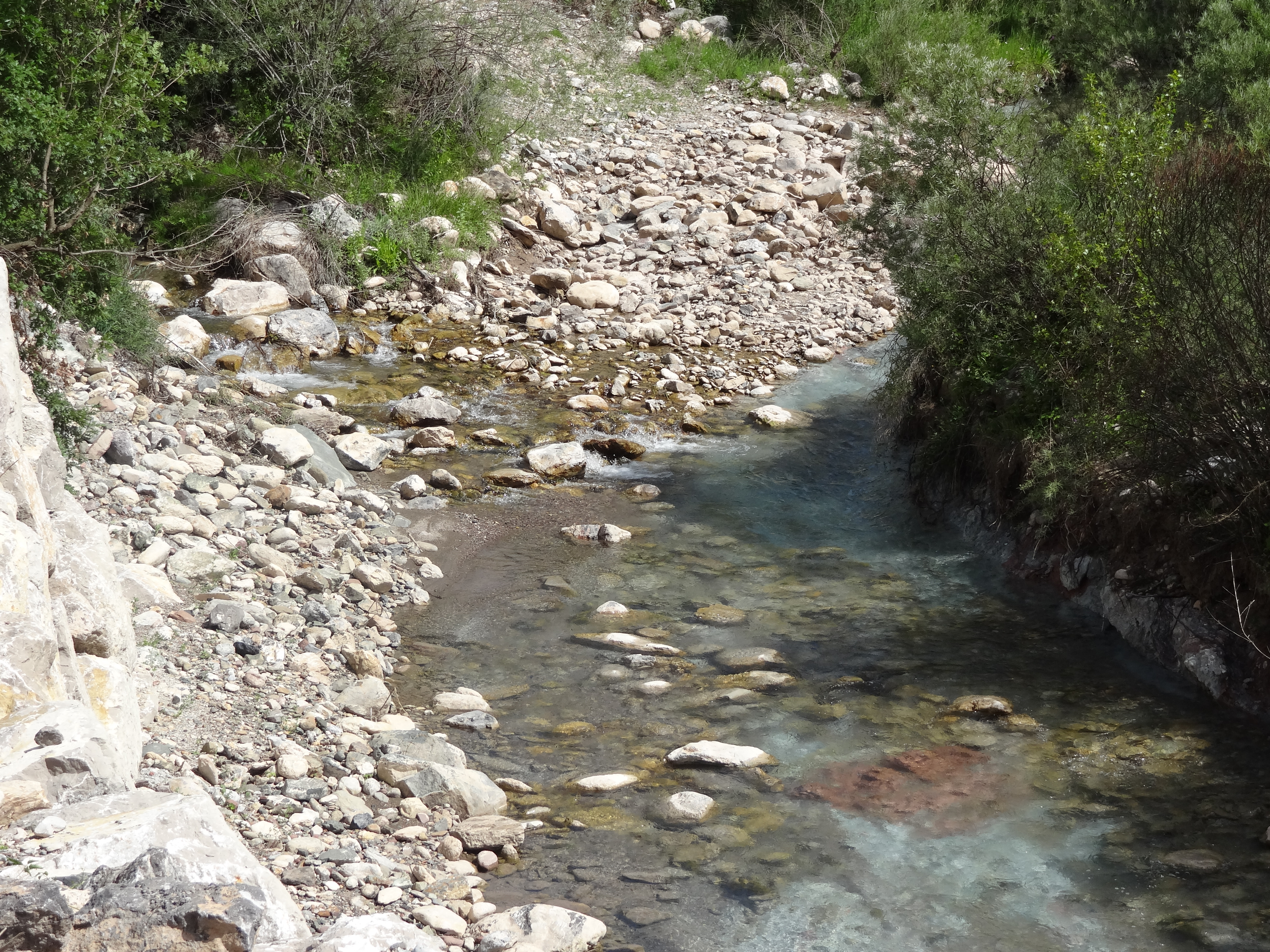
A stream strewn with many rocks – the preferred habitat of the Pyrenean desman (here on the Noguera Ribagorçana).

The Pyrenean desman typically inhabits oligotrophic streams at low, medium, and high elevations, characterised by clear, nutrient-poor water. These watercourses have a permanent flow and a sufficiently strong current. The species generally avoids intermittent streams and poorly oxygenated stagnant waters, but it may also occupy high-altitude lakes, both natural and artificial. The Pyrenean desman is a proficient swimmer, suited to its aquatic habitat, although its claws also allow it to be good at climbing.

Rivers inhabited by the desman are usually free from significant anthropogenic pollution. Its prey consists largely of aquatic larvae that are highly sensitive to changes in acidity, temperature, oxygen levels, and water turbidity. For this reason, the presence of the desman is considered an indicator of high water quality, and the species is widely regarded as a reliable bioindicator. The habitat of the Pyrenean desman is under threat, and recent studies have shown dramatic declines in species occurrence in several parts of its range in the last few decades.

A range of environmental factors influences the species' distribution. Altitude alone does not appear to be the primary limiting factor; instead, climatic and geological conditions are thought to play a more important role in determining habitat suitability.

==== Altitudinal limits ====
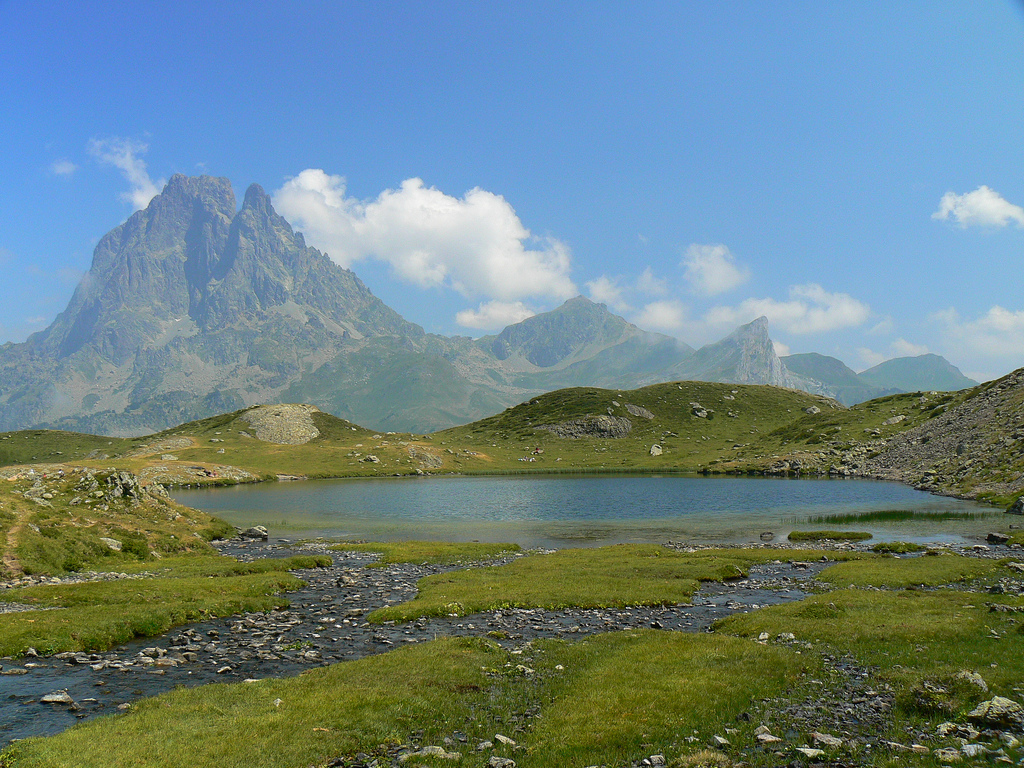
The Lacs d'Ayous, in the French Pyrenees, a territory inhabited by the desman.

The Pyrenean desman shows some tolerance to a wide altitudinal range, although it is most commonly associated with mid- and high-mountain environments. In France, the species has been recorded at 15 m (49 ft) above sea level near Saint-Pée-sur-Nivelle in the Pyrénées-Atlantiques. This record is considered exceptional; in other French Pyrenean departments where systematic surveys have been conducted (Ariège, Aude, Pyrénées-Orientales), the species is generally found from 400 m (1,300 ft) upward. On the Spanish side of the range, where precipitation levels are lower, the minimum recorded altitude is approximately 1,000 m (3,300 ft).

The highest documented occurrences are at 2,021 m (6,631 ft) on the French side, at the Lacs d'Ayous in the upper Ossau Valley (Pyrénées-Atlantiques), and at 2,500 m (8,200 ft) on the Spanish side of the Pyrenees.

Populations inhabiting the shores of the Lacs d'Ayous within the Pyrenees National Park exhibit particular ecological conditions. This group of approximately ten lakes remains frozen for around six months each year. As the Pyrenean desman does not hibernate, these populations are thought to retreat into underground watercourses during part of the year and are therefore considered troglophile.

==== Limits related to rainfall ====
The distribution of the Pyrenean desman closely corresponds to areas receiving more than 1,000 mm (39 in) of annual precipitation. Studies conducted at the CNRS laboratory in Moulis (Ariège) indicate that the species depends on relatively deep watercourses, which in turn require sustained and regular rainfall. In the Salat basin upstream of Saint-Girons, observations show that the desman occurs only in left-bank tributaries receiving approximately 1,500 mm (59 in) of rainfall per year, and is absent from right-bank tributaries where annual precipitation does not exceed 900 mm (35 in).

==== Limits related to underlying geology ====
Analysis of the bedrock using Franco-Iberian geological maps indicates that most of the Pyrenean desman's range is associated with areas dominated by metamorphic or magmatic substrates, including granite, syenite, basalt, marble, slate, gneiss, and schist. By contrast, watercourses flowing over predominantly sedimentary formations are generally avoided.

The geological nature of the substrate influences the quantity of alluvium transported by streams, which in turn affects water turbidity and the development of microscopic and macroscopic algae. The aquatic larvae that constitute the desman's main food resource are particularly sensitive to environmental conditions, especially light availability, and are typically associated with waters low in suspended particles and aquatic vegetation. As a result, the species shows a preference for streams draining crystalline substrates and is less frequently recorded in habitats characterized by high loads of fine sediment.

=== Population estimates ===
According to data from the Pyrenees National Park published in 1993, the Pyrenean desman was recorded in 236 zones in the French Pyrenees. Each zone corresponded to a square of approximately 71.5 km^{2} (27.6 sq mi) (about 8 km (5.0 mi) per side), representing a total area of 1,687,400 ha (4,170,000 acres). This figure does not correspond to the species' effective habitat, however, as the desman occupies only the watercourses within these zones rather than the entire surface area, resulting in a substantially smaller area of actual occupancy.

Using the same density estimates, population size was calculated at approximately one individual per square kilometre. When extrapolated to the French Pyrenees as a whole, this corresponds to an estimated population of fewer than 17,000 individuals in France. Studies conducted in the 2010s reported higher densities, estimated at 2–5 individuals per linear kilometre in France and 3–7 individuals per linear kilometre in Spain. In favourable local conditions, densities may be higher still.

Some authors have suggested that population size at this level could allow reproductive output to exceed the species' renewal threshold, potentially enabling population growth. However, elevated mortality rates appear to offset recruitment, resulting in overall population stability. A reversal of this balance could increase the risk of population decline.

== Life cycle ==
=== Territory and lifestyle ===
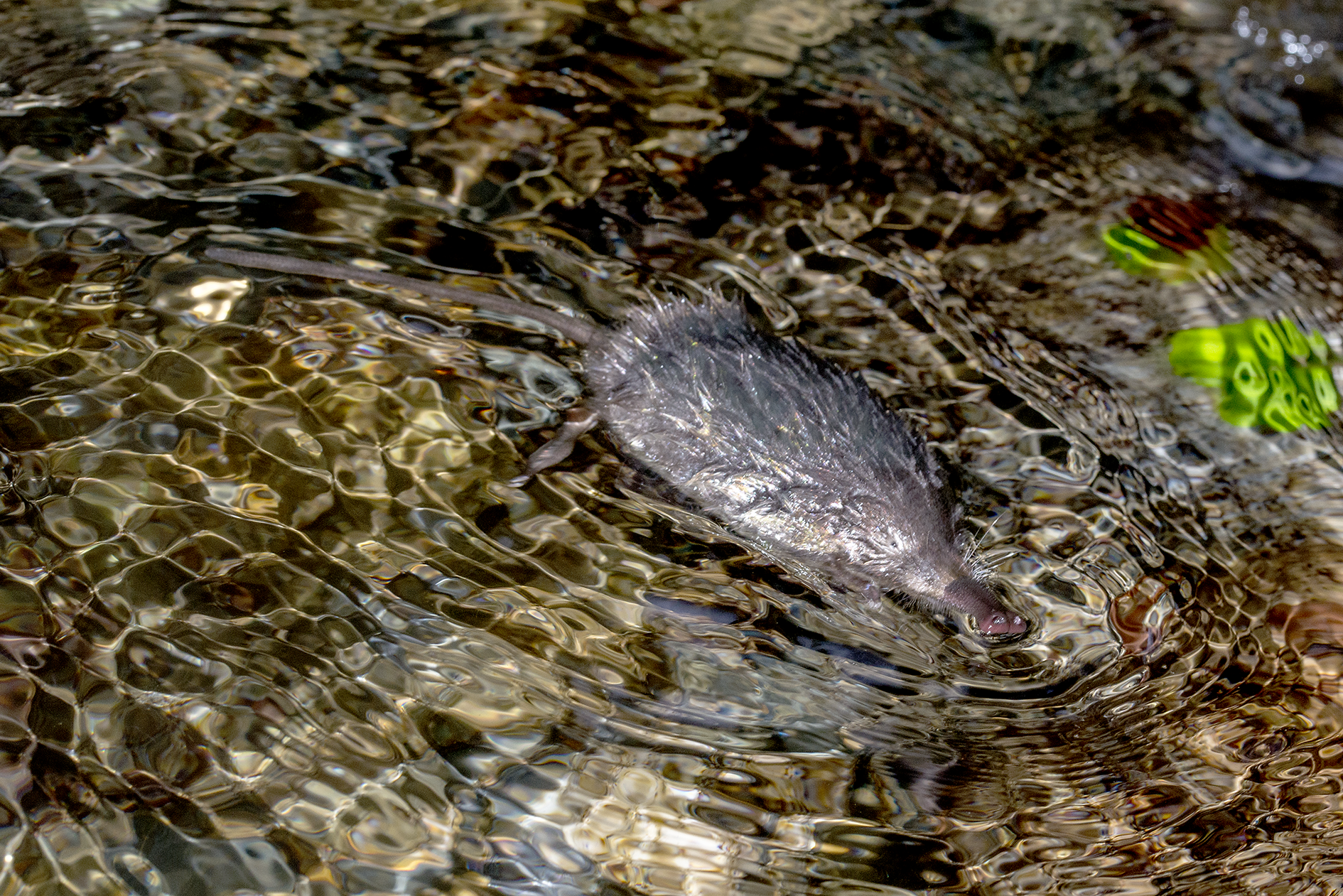
Pyrenean desman swimming on the surface of the water (Spanish Basque Country).

The Pyrenean desman occupies a defined home range, typically alone or as a pair, although non-territorial or dispersing individuals have also been recorded. Home-range size varies according to local conditions, including food availability, population density, and the sex of the individual. On average, territories extend over several hundred metres of river. Females generally occupy about 250 m (820 ft) of linear watercourse, males about 450 m (1,480 ft), and pairs sharing the same sector up to 800 m (2,600 ft). Within paired territories, individuals usually remain spatially segregated, using separate resting burrows while occupying the same stretch of river. Some studies indicate that females tend to occupy the central part of the territory, with males more frequently using peripheral areas. Both males and females scent mark. They have been thought to be aggressive towards other adult members of the species. However, more recent research suggests they are non-territorial and that adults have overlapping home ranges.

Juvenile dispersal and seasonal movements by adults have been suggested, although their extent and frequency remain uncertain.

Recent research has documented social interactions and suggests the existence of a more flexible spatial organisation than previously assumed. Home ranges of several individuals, of the same or different sex, may overlap, and encounters do not necessarily result in aggressive behaviour. Individuals typically use two to three resting sites, and occasionally up to seven, some of which may be shared with conspecifics.

The desman regularly patrols its territory and appears to detect environmental changes. It uses a behaviour described as "drumming", striking the water surface with its forepaws to generate low-frequency waves whose reflections may provide information about its surroundings. This mechanism has been compared to forms of echolocation observed in other aquatic mammals. Individuals have also been observed releasing small air bubbles during underwater movement, which may limit dive duration. The function of this behaviour is not fully understood; hypotheses include a sensory role similar to echolocation or a link to chemical perception via the vomeronasal organ.

Resting burrows are not excavated by the desman itself but are usually existing cavities created by other animals along riverbanks or natural shelters among roots and rocks. Observations of captive individuals indicate that a burrow typically consists of an entrance tunnel approximately ten centimetres wide leading to a chamber lined with moss, twigs, and grass, which serves as a nest. A single individual may regularly use several burrows. Riverbank reinforcement using stone reduces the availability of such shelters and is considered a contributing factor to local population declines.

=== Activities ===
==== Daily rhythm ====
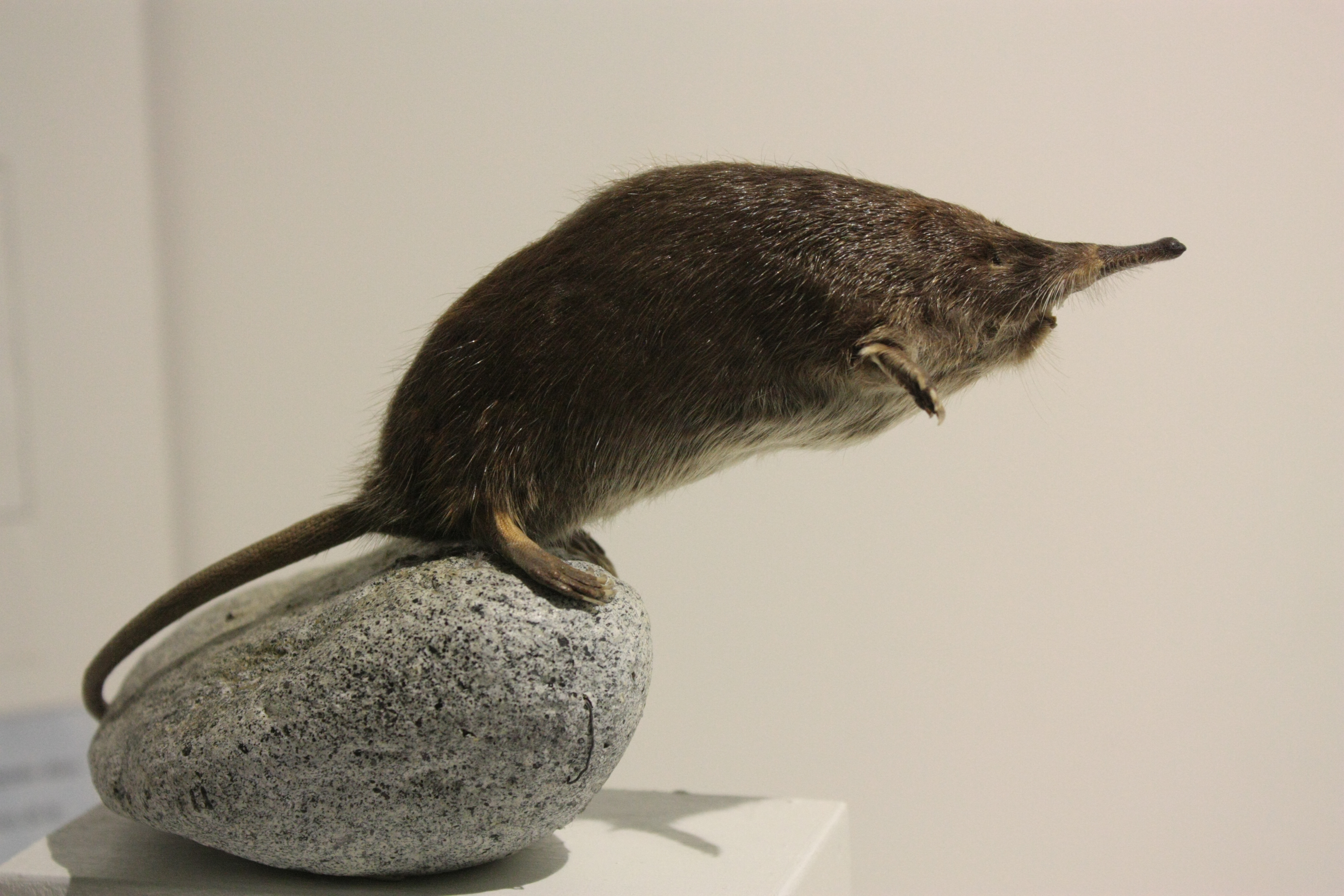
Taxidermied desman in a dynamic pose.

The Pyrenean desman alternates between periods of aquatic activity and rest on land within its burrow. Its activity pattern is bimodal but predominantly nocturnal. Analyses of daily rhythms indicate that nocturnal activity lasts approximately eight hours, with peak activity between 23:00 and 05:00 and cessation around 07:00. Diurnal activity is more limited, generally lasting one to three hours in the early afternoon. The species spends roughly half of the day resting in its nest. Adverse weather conditions, such as thunderstorms accompanied by heavy rainfall, can delay emergence from the burrow by several hours.

Seasonal variation has been observed in activity patterns. From February to May, diurnal activity increases and may exceed two hours, corresponding to the breeding period. In autumn, diurnal activity is reduced to a minimum, while nocturnal activity intensifies and is often divided into two periods of approximately five hours, separated by a rest phase during the night.

==== Locomotion ====
The desman is capable of swimming against strong currents and ascending small waterfalls by gripping rocks with its long claws. On land, its locomotion is relatively awkward due to the disproportionate size of the hind limbs, and it moves by walking on the tips of its claws.

Terrestrial movements along riverbanks or on midstream rocks are infrequent and generally correspond to rest periods used for grooming and drying the dense fur. Numerous pauses are taken between dives. Grooming typically involves vigorous shaking followed by careful brushing of the coat with the hind claws, during which the fur is coated with an oily waterproof secretion produced by the sebaceous glands.

==== Reproduction ====
Sexual activity occurs from December to May in males and from February to June in females, with timing varying by region according to temperature, climate, and altitude. There is no clearly defined breeding season, although three peaks in gestation have been identified in February, March, and May. Females may produce more than one litter per year, but this has not been conclusively demonstrated.

The duration of gestation has not been directly observed, and neither gestation nor neonates younger than three months have been documented. By comparison with other members of the Talpidae family, gestation is estimated to last approximately 30–40 d (3,500 ks). Lactation is reported to last around four to five weeks.

Parturition has not been observed directly but is presumed to take place in underground burrows. Litter size does not exceed five individuals and more commonly comprises three to four. Females possess eight teats: two pectoral, two abdominal, and four inguinal. Sexual maturity is reported to be reached within a few weeks.

==== Lifespan ====
Males and females are reported to live for approximately three to four years. Marked individuals have been recaptured up to three years after their initial capture, and analyses of dentition in 87 specimens have not identified any individuals older than four years.

Breeding in captivity has not been documented. Captive individuals may die if husbandry conditions do not adequately meet the species' ecological and physiological requirements.

=== Diet ===
==== Foraging ====
Foraging on the stream bed constitutes the desman's principal activity. Prey is located using highly developed tactile and olfactory senses, including liquid-phase olfaction mediated by the vomeronasal organ and, in particular, tactile perception via vibrissae and Eimer's organs on the trunk. These sensory systems enable prey detection either indirectly, through movement or odour, or by direct contact. Precise localisation of prey in water has been reported at distances of up to 5 cm (2.0 in), while the presence of potential prey may be perceived over several tens of centimetres.

The desman is unable to pursue actively swimming prey or items carried rapidly by the current. Its diet therefore consists mainly of benthic larvae found in slower-flowing sections of streams, and more rarely of insects encountered near the water surface.

==== Food ====
The desman has a high metabolic rate and must consume approximately one-third to one-half of its body mass daily (20–30 g (0.71–1.06 oz)). During mid-winter, when water temperatures are lowest, daily intake may reach its entire body mass (60 g (2.1 oz)). The mountain winter period (January–April) coincides with both the reproductive phase and peak prey availability.

Analyses of stomach contents, faeces, and observations of captive individuals indicate that the diet consists primarily of benthic invertebrate larvae belonging to three insect orders: mayflies, stoneflies, and caddisflies. Early morphological studies characterised the species as a specialised predator. Molecular analyses of faeces conducted in the 2010s refined this assessment, showing that these three orders account for about 80% of prey items but represent only one-third of the identified prey species. Additional prey include dipteran larvae and crustaceans such as freshwater shrimp. A broad range of other taxa is consumed opportunistically, including beetles, lacewings, true bugs, moths, dragonflies, myriapods, arachnids, newts, snails, and occasionally fish.

Main prey of the Pyrenean desman:

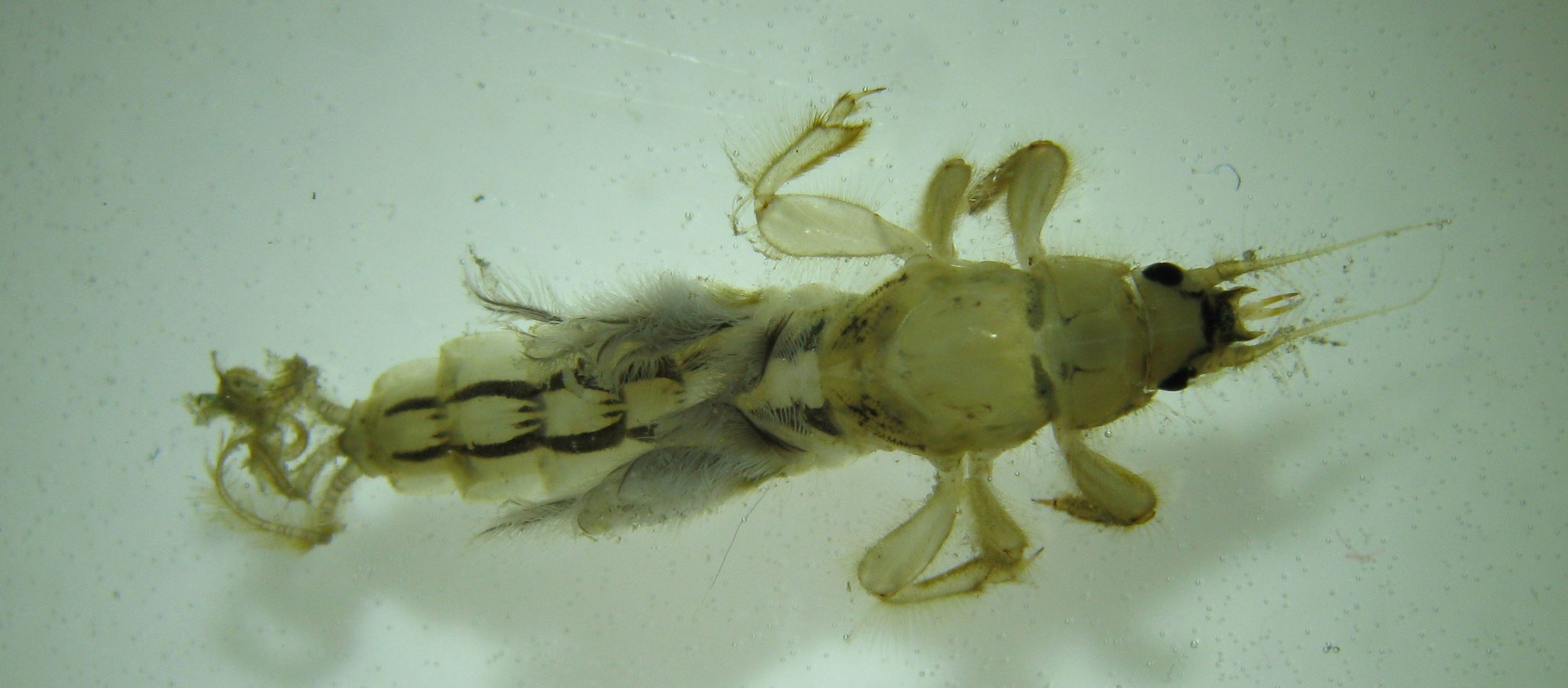
Larva of mayfly

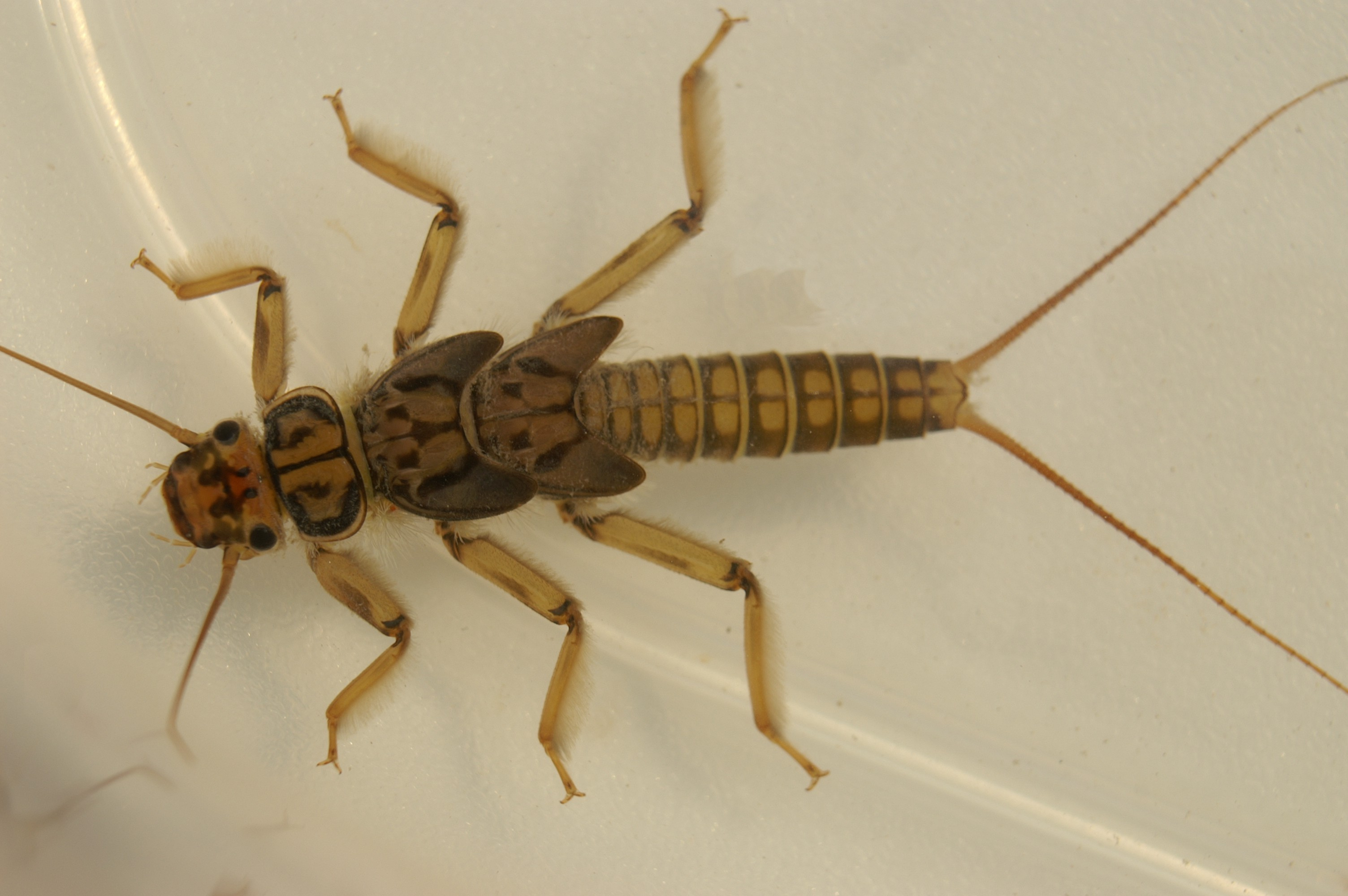
Larva of stonefly

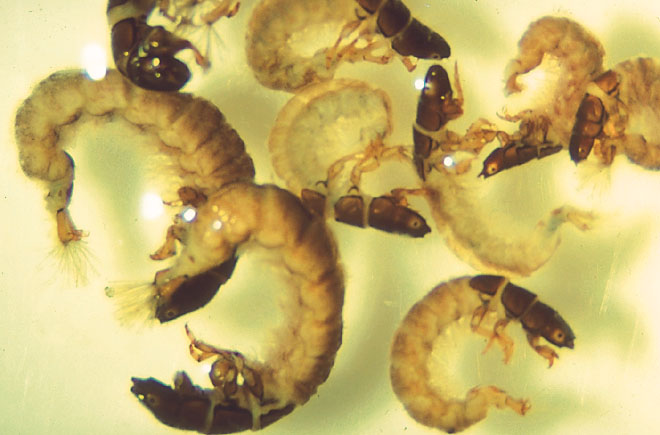
Larvae of caddisfly

Strictly terrestrial prey, such as spiders, grasshoppers, and earthworms, account for around 10% of prey items and more than one-third of identified species. These prey are less frequent outside summer and may result from active foraging on land, incidental encounters, or accidental immersion.

In contrast to the larger Russian desman, the Pyrenean desman has only rarely been observed consuming fish or amphibians, a finding corroborated by molecular analyses of faecal samples.

Caddisfly larvae, which are energy-rich, appear to be preferentially selected and are captured during dives lasting approximately 15–20 s (0.25–0.33 min). Their relatively large size facilitates capture and provides a high energetic return relative to effort. Small prey are swallowed underwater, whereas larger larvae are typically consumed out of the water on banks or rocks, with the animal sitting on its hind legs and manipulating prey using its prehensile trunk. Dietary diversification has been interpreted as a response to changes in aquatic communities associated with environmental stressors such as pollution or seasonal fluctuations in climate and water flow.

Earlier interpretations attributed the species' sensitivity primarily to anthropogenic pollution; however, subsequent studies indicate that the aquatic larvae on which it depends are themselves highly sensitive to changes in water clarity, acidity, and oxygenation. Monitoring physico-chemical parameters of the desman's aquatic habitat, including indicators such as biochemical oxygen demand, is therefore considered important.

=== Predation ===
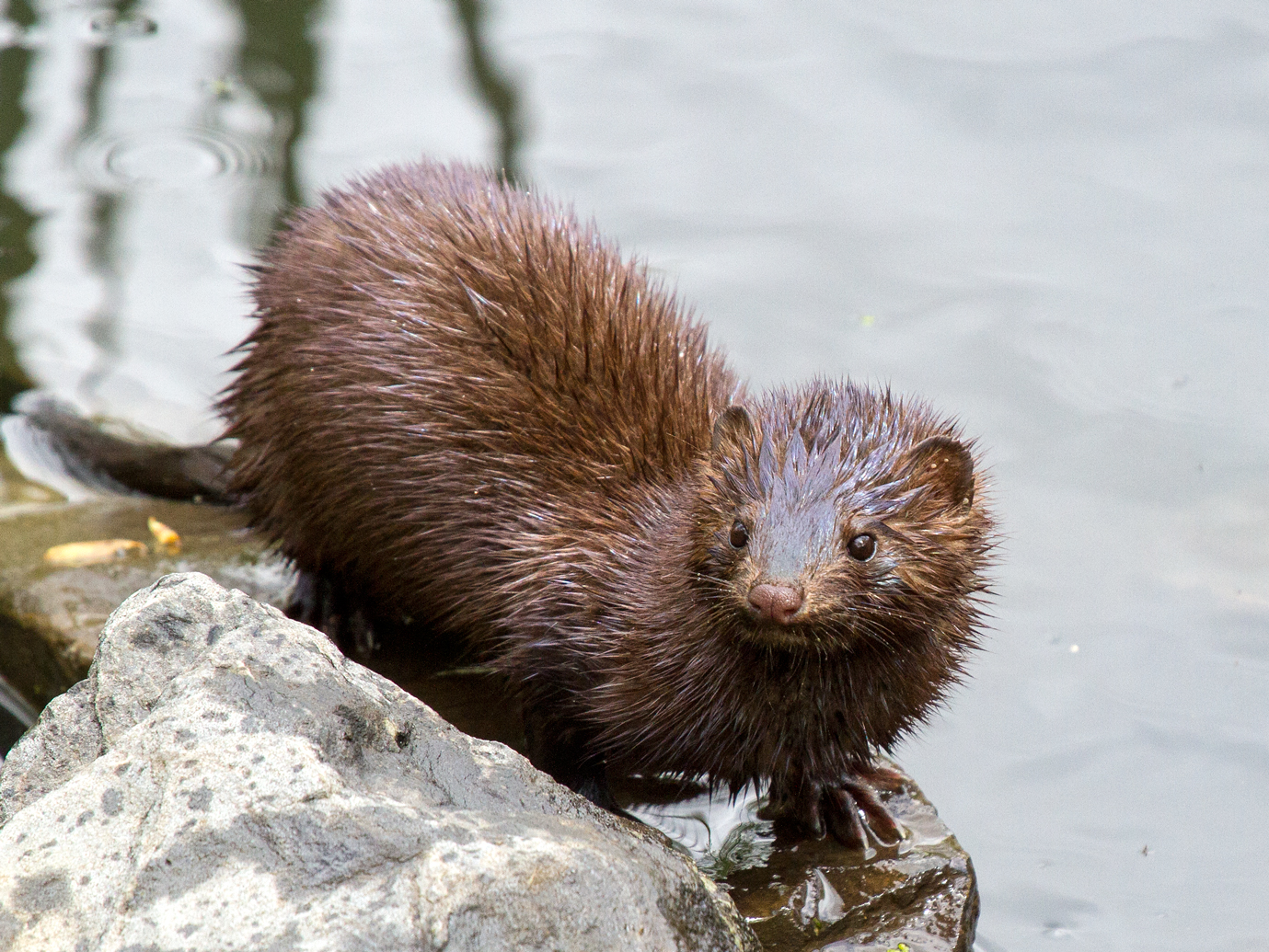
The American mink, a predator of the Pyrenean desman.

The desman is preyed upon mainly by the Eurasian otter. Other documented predators include the common buzzard, northern pike, stoat, tawny owl, white stork, grey heron, and black-crowned night heron. Predation by the barn owl has been reported only rarely.

The invasive American mink, which is widespread in the Cantabrian Mountains, represents an additional predation pressure in Spain, where numerous predation events have been recorded. Domestic dogs and cats have also been identified as potential predators.

=== Parasitism ===
Most aquatic invertebrates consumed by the desman, at both larval and adult stages, are capable of acting as intermediate hosts for parasitic worms. The most frequently reported trematode is Omphalometra flexuosa, which is also found in the European mole; its encysted larval stage develops in the freshwater shrimp Gammarus pulex. Maritrema pyrenaica is another trematode shared with the Eurasian water shrew; its first intermediate host is the snail Bythinella reyniesii, with subsequent larval encystment occurring in the shrimp Echinogammarus berilloni. The trematode Mathovius galemydis and the nematode Paracuaria hispanica are known only from Iberian desmans and use aquatic arthropods or crustaceans as intermediate hosts.

The external mite Eadiea longisetosa, also found on the Russian desman, inhabits the desman's fur.

The parasite fauna of the desman is likely incomplete. For instance, the trematode Pseudocephalotrema pyrenaica is common in habitats typically occupied by the desman and may parasitise it, although this association has not yet been formally demonstrated.

== Taxonomy ==
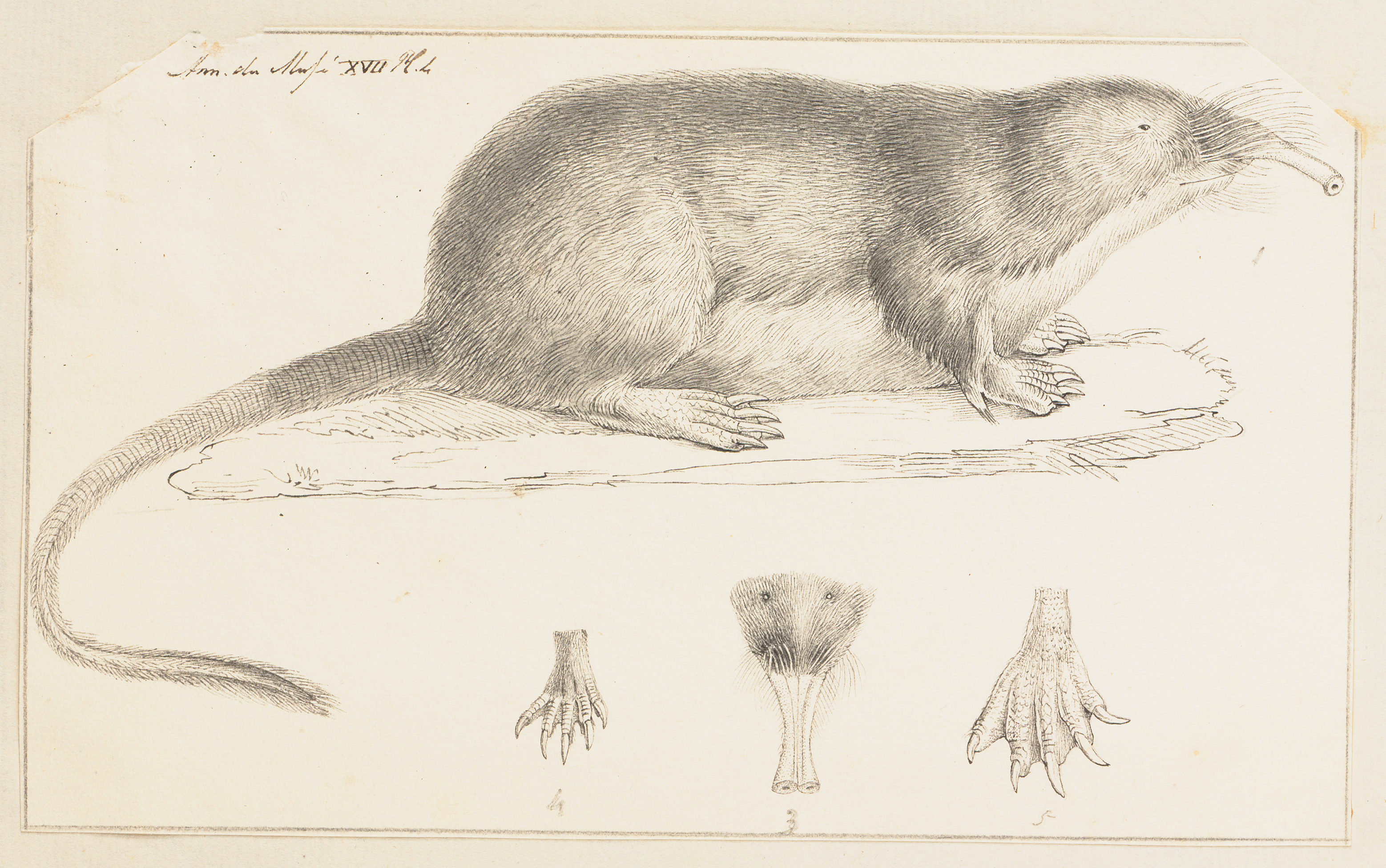
Pyrenean desman. Somewhat unrealistic illustration from before 1880 (collections of the University of Amsterdam).

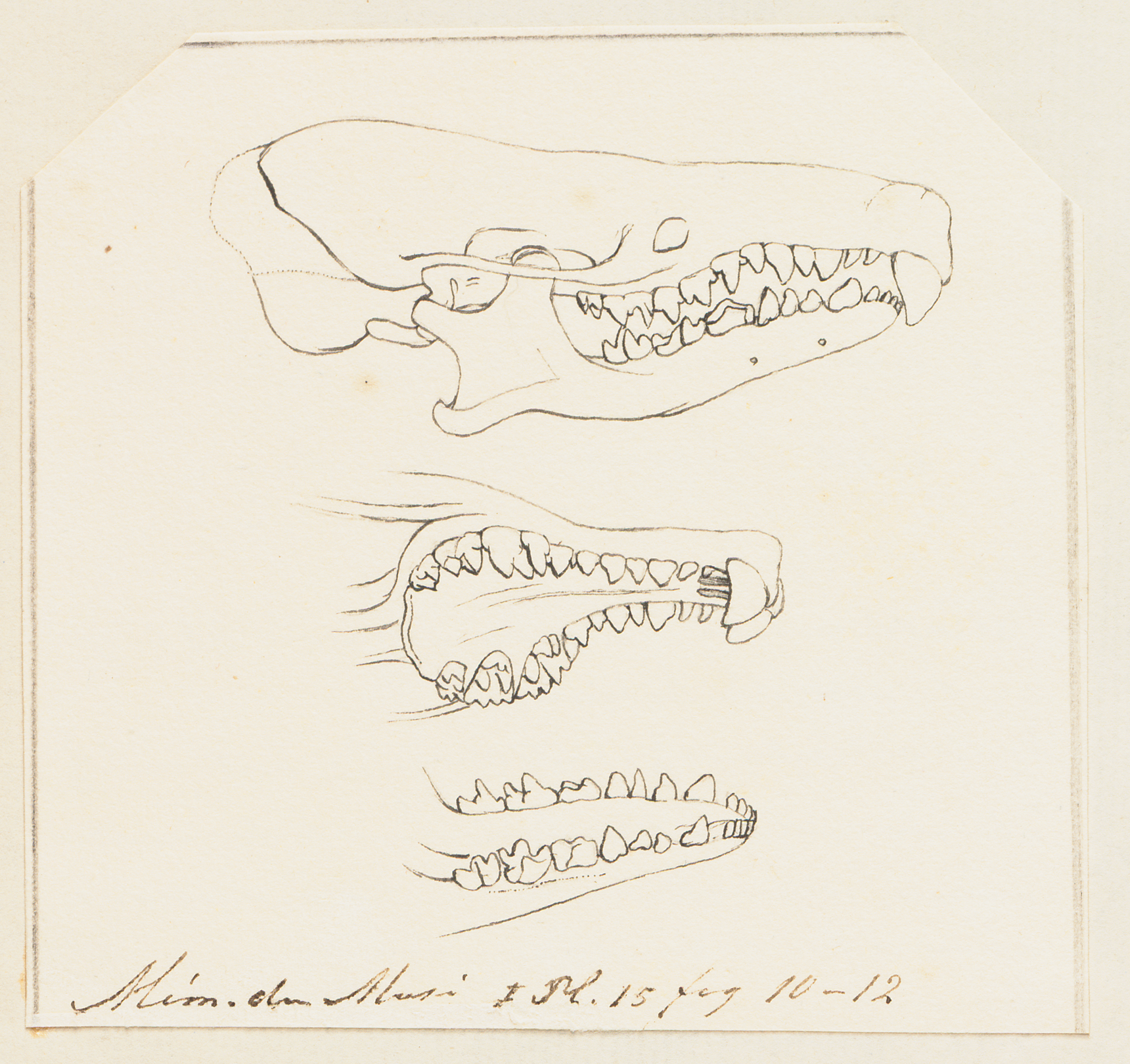
Skull and jaws of the nominate subspecies of the Pyrenean desman (University of Amsterdam collections).

The type locality is in France, described as "in the mountains near Tarbes", in the Hautes-Pyrénées department. The holotype—the preserved specimen on which the original species description was based—is housed at the Muséum national d'histoire naturelle in Paris.

In 1829, the species was reassigned to the genus Galemys by the German naturalist Johann Jakob Kaup, who designated it as the type species of the genus.

=== Etymology ===
The generic name Galemys is derived from the Ancient Greek γαλῆ (galễ, meaning "weasel") and μῦς (mûs, meaning "mouse").

The term "desman" originates from the Swedish desman ("musk"), a diminutive of desmanrätte ("muskrat"). This word ultimately derives from Middle Low German Desem and Medieval Latin bisamum, both of which refer to musk.

=== Synonymy ===
Galemys pyrenaicus has the following synonyms:

- Mygale pyreneica Geoffroy Saint-Hilaire, 1811 (protonym)
- Myogalea pyrenaica (Geoffroy Saint-Hilaire, 1811)
- Desmana pyrenaica (Geoffroy Saint-Hilaire, 1811)

=== Vernacular names ===
In French, the taxon bears the standardised common names "Desman des Pyrénées" and "Desman ibérique", as well as the vernacular names "Rat-trompette" and, more rarely, "Taupe des Pyrénées".

=== Phylogeny ===
The Pyrenean desman is an insectivorous mammal belonging to the family Talpidae, subfamily Desmaninae, and is the sole extant species in the genus Galemys. Its closest living relative, and the only other surviving desmanine, is the larger Russian desman (Desmana moschata), which occurs in the drainage basins of the Volga, Ural, and Don rivers.

The species has a diploid chromosome number of 42. Karyological studies indicate affinities with the genus Talpa, supporting its placement within the order Eulipotyphla and the family Talpidae. Molecular analyses based on mitochondrial DNA and nuclear DNA have produced less consistent results regarding the position of desmans within the family. Some studies place them approximately equidistant from the tribes Condylurini (which includes the star-nosed mole) and Talpini (which includes the European mole and Spanish mole), while others suggest a closer relationship with the Talpini. These analyses consistently support a close evolutionary relationship between the Pyrenean and Russian desmans and confirm their assignment to separate, monophyletic genera.

=== Subspecies ===
Two subspecies of the Pyrenean desman are recognised:

- Galemys pyrenaicus pyrenaicus (Geoffroy Saint-Hilaire, 1811)
- Galemys pyrenaicus rufulus (Graells, 1897)

The subspecies rufulus was described in 1897 by the Spanish naturalist Mariano de la Paz Graells as the variety Myogalea pyrenaica var. rufula, based on specimens collected in the Valsaín Valley in the Sierra de Guadarrama of central Spain. Graells distinguished this taxon primarily by its yellowish fur, described as giving a golden appearance underwater, and by the presence of bright yellow skin and claws on both the fore and hind feet; by contrast, the nominate form was characterised by browner fur with a silvery appearance underwater and brown feet.

By the 2000s, the two subspecies were recognised as being geographically well separated: pyrenaicus occurs in the Pyrenees on both the French and Spanish sides, whereas rufulus is found in other mountain ranges of northwestern Iberia. Differences in coloration are no longer regarded as diagnostically reliable, and the subspecies are now distinguished mainly on the basis of cranial morphometric characters.

== Paleontology ==
Fossil evidence documents the presence of several desmanine species across Europe, ranging from the Urals to the Atlantic coast, from the middle Miocene approximately 15 million years ago until the end of that epoch around 5.3 million years ago. The two extant desman species are therefore regarded as remnants of formerly more widespread populations that became fragmented during successive glaciations. The Russian desman is morphologically and in overall size closer to early desmanines than the Pyrenean desman, whose evolutionary pathway toward adaptation to mountain environments and subsequent speciation remains poorly understood. Molecular analyses estimate the divergence between the two species, and thus between the two genera, at approximately 10 million years ago.

The genus Galemys is known from the late Pliocene (about 2.6 million years ago), after which its distribution progressively contracted from central and western Europe to its southwestern limit, the Iberian Peninsula. This region, whose mountain areas were not covered by ice during the last glaciations, is considered to have acted as a refugium. This pattern suggests that Galemys was already specialised for fast-flowing mountain waters and that the Pyrenean desman represents a relict species.

The evolutionary divergence between the subfamilies Talpinae and Desmaninae is poorly documented in the fossil record. Molecular data indicate that this split occurred around 37 million years ago, near the transition from the middle to the late Eocene.

== Anthropogenic threats ==
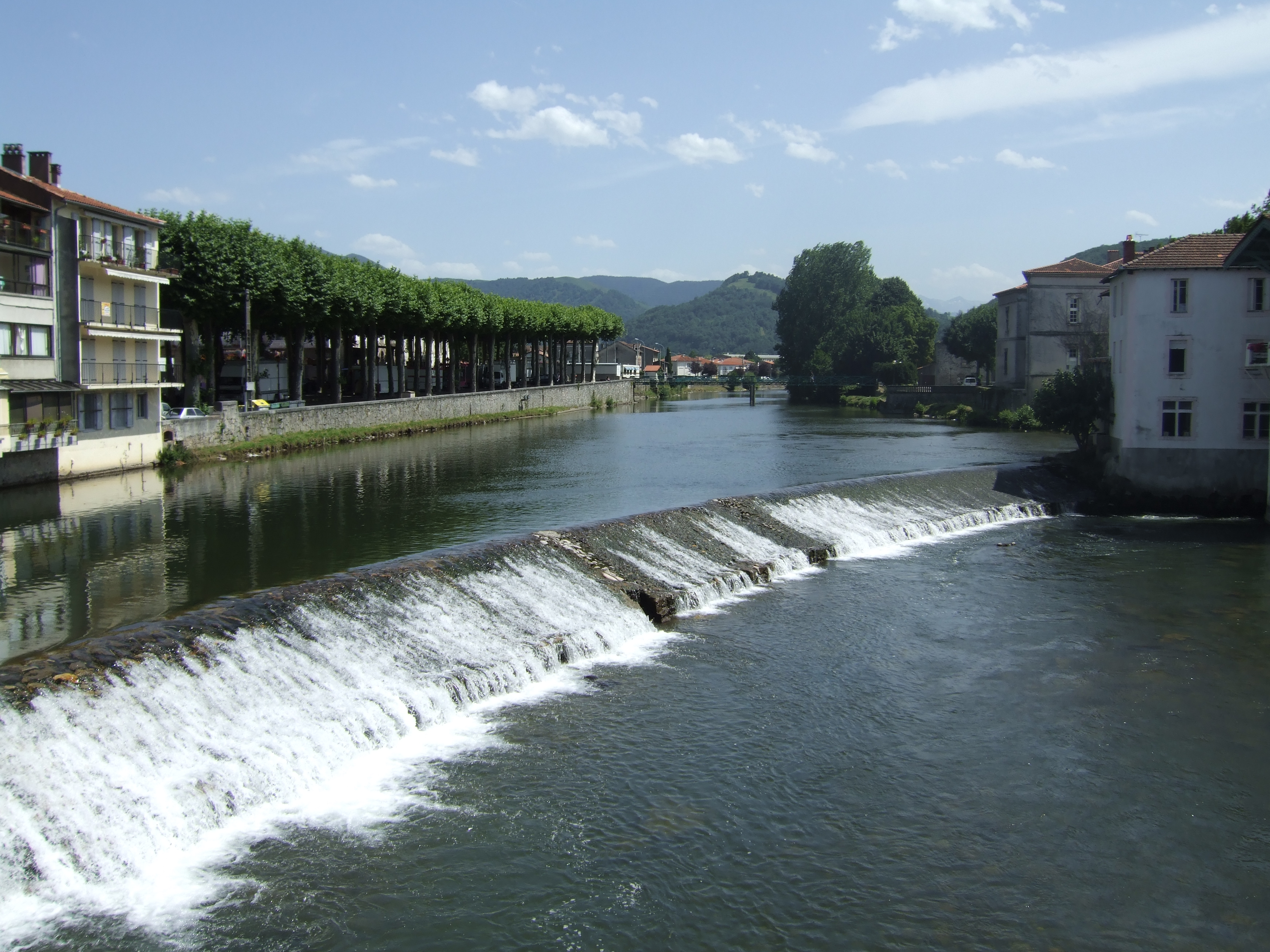
Weir on the Salat at Saint-Girons in Ariège.

The Pyrenean desman is a species highly specialised for life in mountain streams, a habitat that is declining as mountainous areas undergo increasing human modification. Habitat fragmentation resulting from infrastructure development is considered the primary threat. The long-term persistence of the species in both France and the Iberian Peninsula largely depends on the conservation and restoration of suitable natural habitats.

Several pressures associated with urban and technological expansion in the early 21st century pose risks to the species. These include water impoundments that cause abrupt changes in river flow and temperature; weirs and other barriers that fragment river systems; artificial bank reinforcement and wetland drainage that result in direct habitat loss; and various forms of pollution that disrupt aquatic ecosystems. Alterations in current velocity, water depth, acidity, and oxygen availability adversely affect the invertebrate larvae that constitute the desman's primary food source.

=== Water impoundments ===
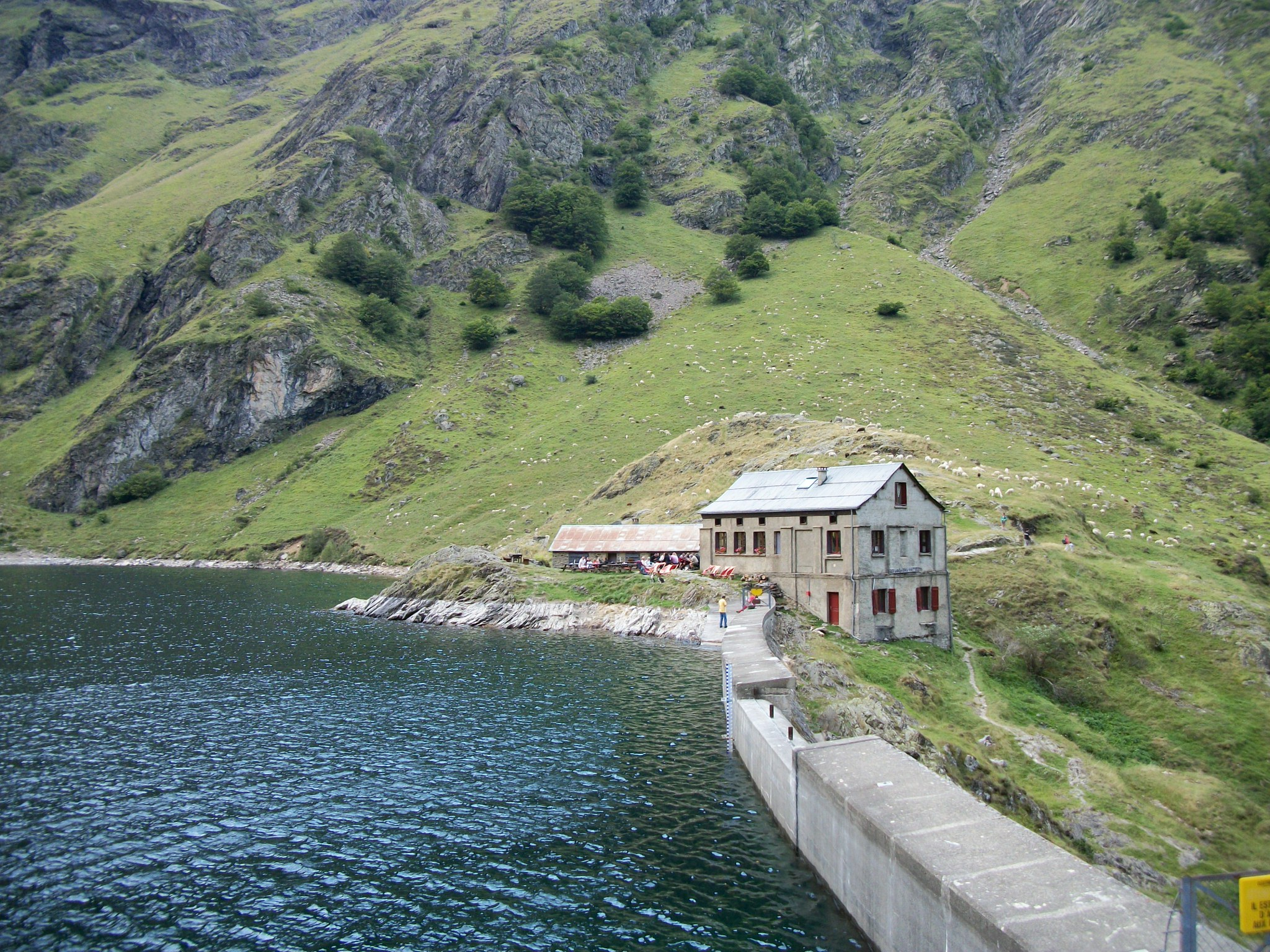
Dam and refuge at Lac d'Oô in the Pyrenees.

In France, Article 2 of Law 84-512 of 29 June 1984 establishes a minimum downstream flow below impoundments. The adequacy of this minimum flow remains debated among Portuguese, Spanish, and French researchers, as very low summer discharges are associated with high mortality in many aquatic species.

To evaluate the potential impacts of dams and other river infrastructures, biotic water analyses were conducted upstream and downstream of the Lac de Bious-Artigues dam in the Pyrénées-Atlantiques and upstream and downstream of the highly polluting paper mill at Eycheil on the Salat in Ariège. These studies detected no significant differences in water quality between upstream and downstream sites at the dam. On this basis, impoundments are not considered to pose an inherent threat to the desman's food resources.

Artificial reservoirs may also present risks through flushing operations. Sudden releases of large volumes of water can mobilise accumulated sediments, increasing downstream turbidity and water opacity and disrupting aquatic fauna, including the desman.

=== Bank reinforcement with riprap ===
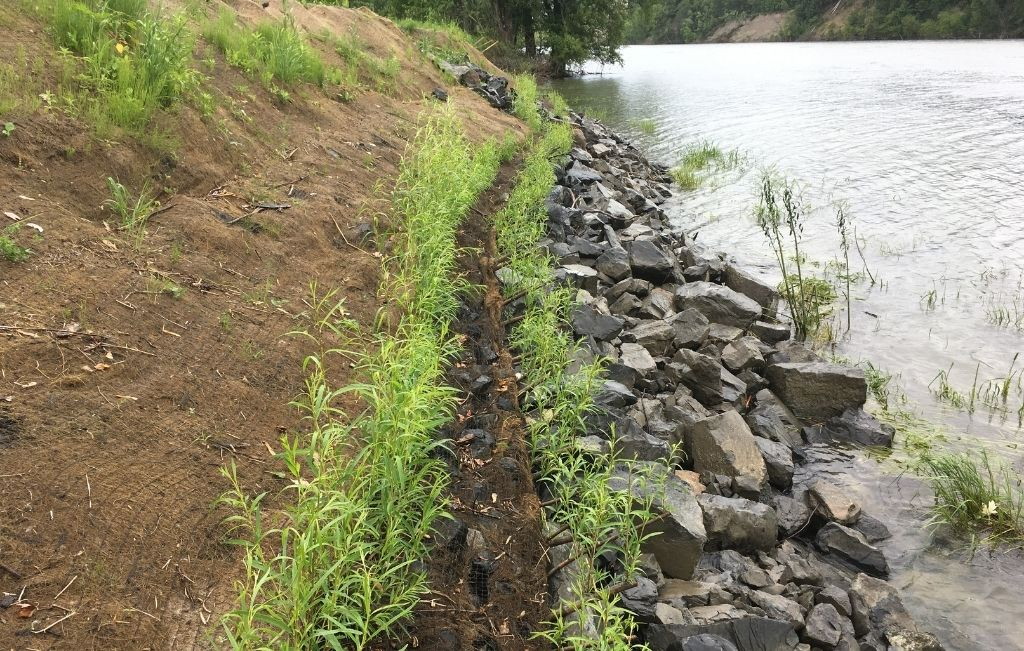
River with artificialised banks.

A study published in 1998 in the journal of the Pyrenees National Park examined changes in desman populations before and after riprap reinforcement of the banks of the Gave d'Aspe in the Aspe Valley. The works substantially reduced the availability of resting sites: of 25 sites known to have been occupied prior to bank modification, only six remained occupied after 1998.

The desman relies on burrows excavated by other animals or on natural cavities for shelter. Since the 2000s, extensive riverbank reinforcement has been undertaken in many Pyrenean municipalities, primarily to protect infrastructure from flooding. As a mitigation measure, artificial wooden burrows lined with natural moss and dead leaves have been tested since the 2010s on streams with limited human disturbance, with the aim of providing alternative resting sites.

=== Water intakes ===
Accidental mortality of desmans has been documented at industrial, agricultural, and private water intakes. Individuals may enter feeder canals and become trapped in small-diameter pipes or against protective grilles at high-flow intakes.

=== Water pollution ===
Physico-chemical water pollution can disrupt mountain stream ecosystems. Changes in temperature, turbidity, acidity, or oxygenation may lead to the decline or disappearance of insect larvae that constitute the desman's primary food resource.

=== Fishing and fish farming ===
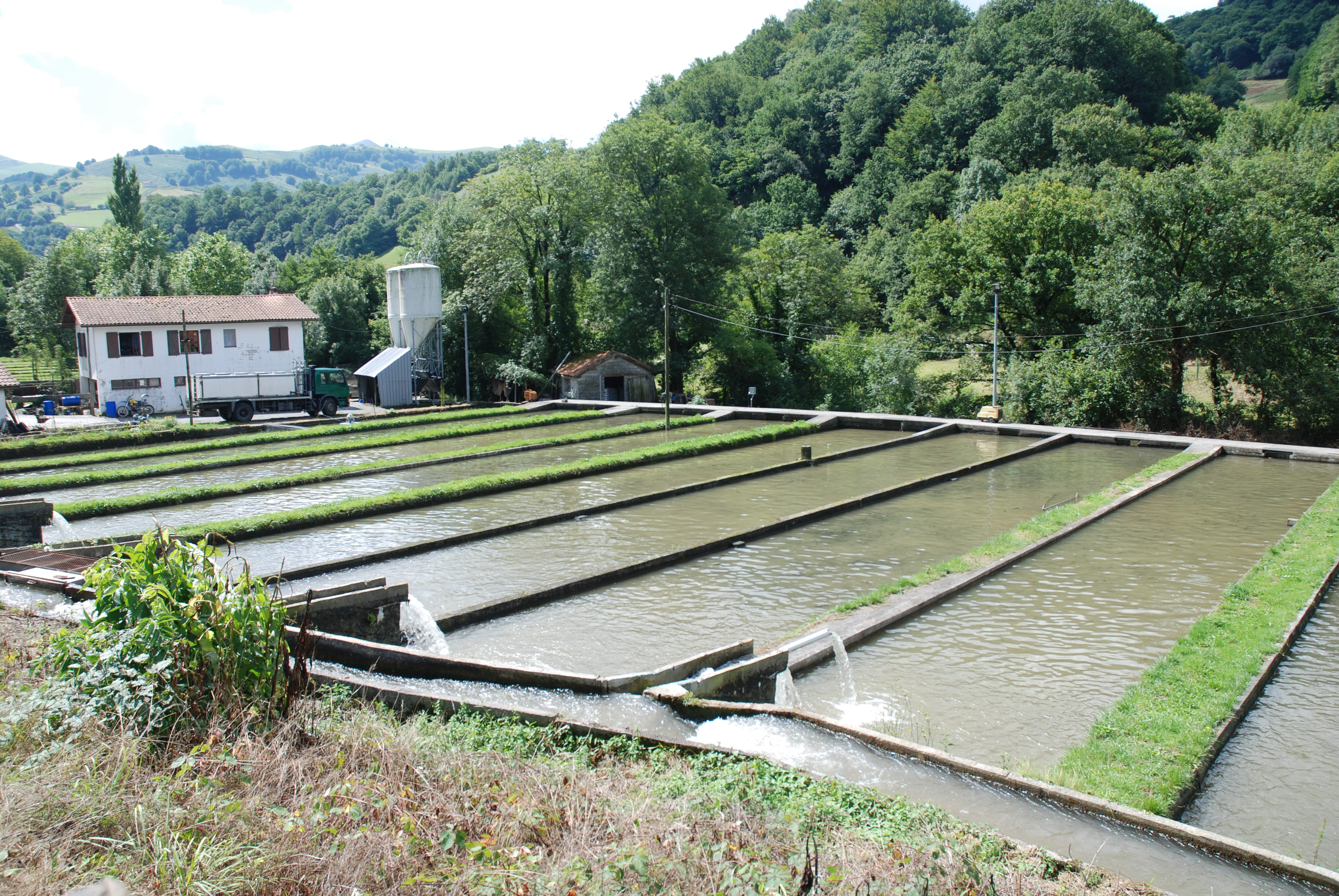
Fish-farm installations in the Aldudes, French Basque Country.

Until the 2000s, some anglers and fish farmers killed desmans under the belief that they preyed on fish. This perception was influenced by folklore, limited knowledge of the species' ecology, and inaccurate media reports in the 1980s and 1990s, including photographs of captive desmans fed exclusively on fish.

Awareness-raising initiatives conducted in the 2010s among the general public, anglers, and fish farmers have contributed to improving perceptions of the species. The promotion of best practices, such as the collection of discarded fishing line, aims to reduce accidental mortality through drowning or strangulation.

=== Tourism ===
As desman activity is primarily nocturnal, it is generally little affected by tourist presence. However, certain recreational water activities that involve trampling stream beds, particularly canyoning, can severely degrade the benthic fauna on which the species depends, resulting in indirect impacts. Some studies anticipate local extirpation in heavily frequented areas, such as the Sierra de Guara in the Spanish Pyrenees.

=== Climate change ===
Modelling of the future distribution of the Pyrenean desman under climate scenarios for 2070–2099 indicates potential impacts associated with climate change. Average summer temperature and water balance are identified as the principal factors driving projected range contractions. Under the most severe scenarios, the species is predicted to disappear from the Iberian Sistema Central and northern Portugal, persisting only in high-altitude areas of the remaining massifs, including the Cantabrian Mountains and the Pyrenees. Assisted migration has been proposed as a possible long-term conservation option.

== Conservation ==
=== Population status ===
The desman population was considered to have stabilised during the 1980s; however, assessments conducted in the 2020s indicate a renewed decline. In 2021, the International Union for Conservation of Nature (IUCN) reclassified the species from "Vulnerable" to "Endangered", citing a substantial and ongoing population decrease documented over several years. The IUCN assessment reports an estimated decline of nearly 50% across the species' entire range since 2011.

On the French side of the Pyrenees, the desman has disappeared from approximately 60% of the watercourses it occupied since 2000. The most pronounced declines have occurred in the western part of the range, particularly at lower elevations, whereas populations in the eastern Pyrenees appear more stable across altitudinal gradients. Population densities are also higher in the east, reaching up to 10 individuals per km² in the Aude basin. In 2017, the species' status on the French Red List of Mammals was consequently revised from "Near Threatened" to "Vulnerable".

In Spain, the desman is listed as "Vulnerable" in the Atlas y libro rojo de los mamíferos terrestres de España (Red List of Mammals of Spain) and as "Critically Endangered" in the Sistema Central since 2007. In Portugal, the species has been classified as "Vulnerable" since 2005, and in Andorra as "Critically Endangered" since 2013.

=== France ===
The Pyrenean desman has been subject to strict legal protection in France since the ministerial decree of 17 April 1981 concerning protected mammals throughout the national territory. Its habitat is also protected under Article L.411-1 of the French Environmental Code and by the ministerial decree of April 23, 2007. The species is listed in Annex II of the Bern Convention and in Annexes II and IV of the Habitats Directive Fauna-Flora 97/62/EEC. As a result, it is prohibited to destroy, mutilate, capture, or intentionally disturb individuals, as well as to destroy or degrade their habitat. The transport, possession, sale, or purchase of individuals, whether alive or dead, is also prohibited.

In 2021, fifty-six Natura 2000 sites were designated for the Pyrenean desman.

One of the main challenges for the implementation of conservation measures is the limited scientific knowledge of the species, particularly with regard to its reproduction and social behaviour.

The conservation of the desman in the Pyrenees and on the Iberian Peninsula has been identified as a priority by scientists, given the species' precarious status. Since the early 2000s, Spanish, Portuguese, and French research teams have undertaken joint discussions aimed at improving its protection. Proposals have included the expansion of the Pyrenees National Park on both the Spanish and French sides, the adoption of more stringent regulations for the protection of threatened species, and the establishment of a core "sanctuary zone" within the national park where human access would be prohibited.

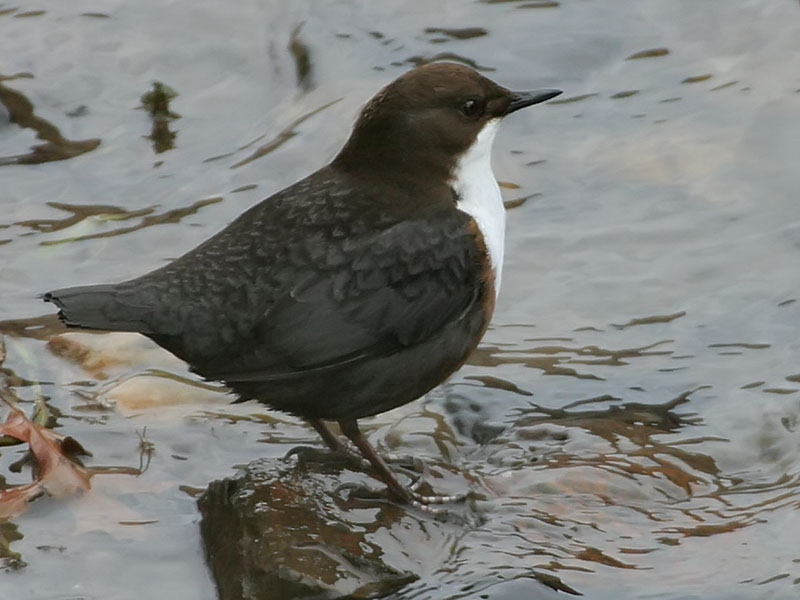
The white-throated dipper shares the habitat of the Pyrenean desman.

In 2010, a national action plan (NAP) covering the period 2010–2015 was launched in France by the Ministry of Ecology. This was followed by a LIFE+ project implemented from 2014 to 2020, coordinated by the Midi-Pyrénées conservatory of natural spaces. The project was co-funded at 50% by the European Union, with the remainder provided by French public institutions (DREAL Occitanie and Nouvelle-Aquitaine, departmental councils, water agencies) and private stakeholders (EDF, SHEM), for a total budget of €2.6 million. These conservation programmes brought together a wide range of stakeholders and contributed to increased awareness among decision-makers and local populations, leading to the integration of habitat protection measures into hydraulic development projects.

The LIFE+ "Desman" project also included field trials of various habitat management measures. These involved the rehabilitation of heavily degraded or anthropised river sections through actions such as the restoration of riparian vegetation and the installation of artificial cavities and burrows. Other sections downstream of reservoirs were designated as "refuge zones" intended to provide shelter during major water releases.

In 2021, a new national action plan for the period 2021–2030 dedicated to the Pyrenean desman was in the process of being finalised by the Ministry of Ecology (France). The species is considered an indicator of well-functioning, unpolluted aquatic environments and has been used to inform broader discussions on the management of Pyrenean and European watercourses. The scientific component of the LIFE+ "Desman" programme has identified the desman as an umbrella species, indicating that conservation measures implemented for its benefit also support numerous other species inhabiting Pyrenean rivers, including the Eurasian otter, the Pyrenean brook salamander, the Eurasian water shrew, trouts, and the white-throated dipper.

=== Spain ===
At the beginning of the 2000s, Spanish authorities identified the absence of reliable, official data on desman populations within the country, alongside an increasing number of informal reports indicating the species' disappearance from parts of its historical range. In the absence of coordinated conservation measures, the continued decline of the species was considered likely.

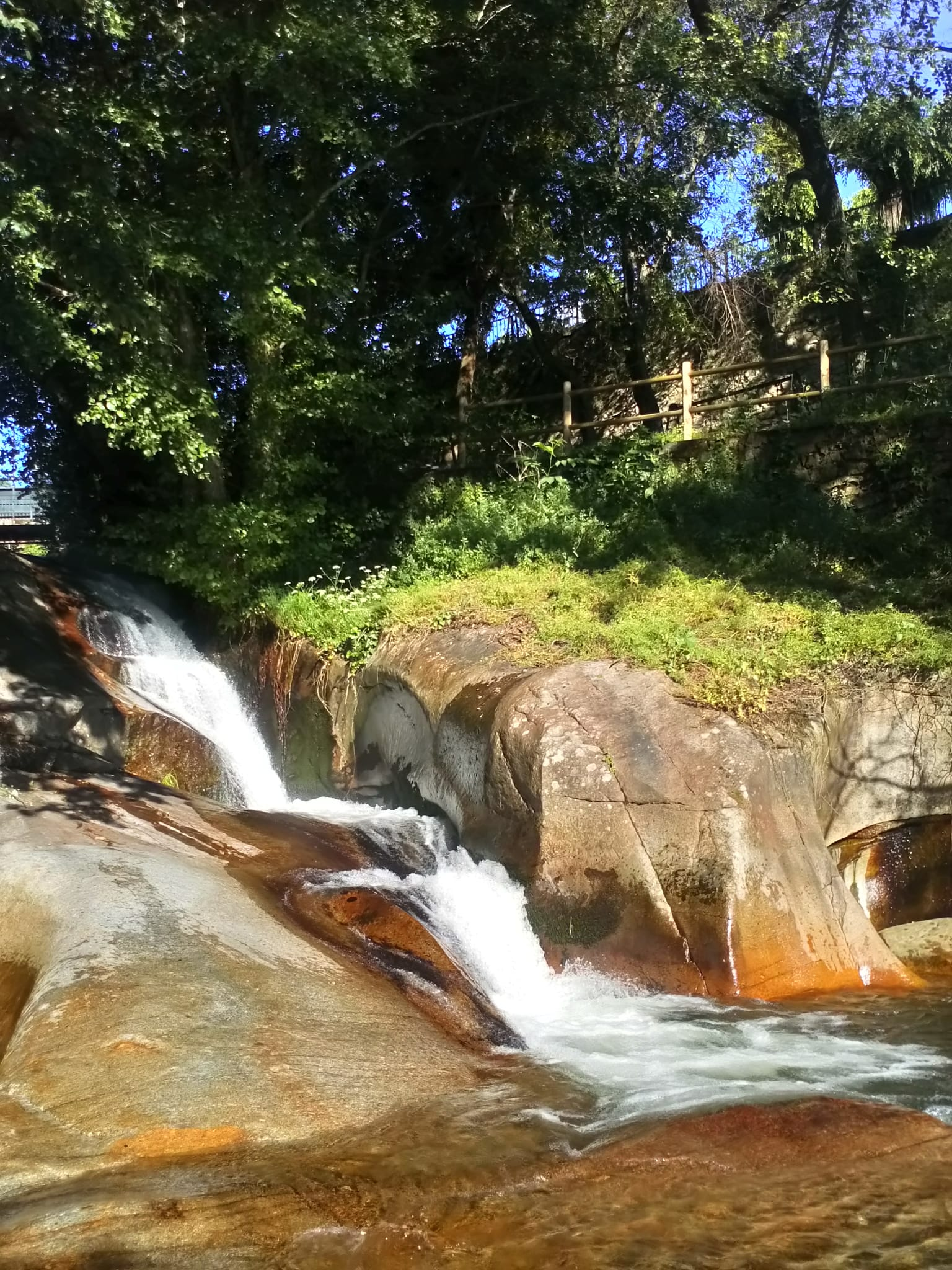
The conservation area of the Sierra de Gredos is part of the desman's range.

From the mid-2000s onward, a marked increase in scientific research on the desman was observed, leading to improved knowledge of the species and contributing to the development of conservation programmes. Research and conservation activities have been carried out primarily by university laboratories, with additional involvement from private consultancies and public bodies at local and regional levels. Funding and coordination have been provided by the Ministry of Ecology, the Fundación Biodiversidad, and the European Union.

Two LIFE projects have been implemented in Spain. The LIFE+ "Margal Ulla" project was conducted from 2010 to 2015 and focused on the restoration of desman populations along the Ulla River in Galicia. The broader LIFE+ "Desmania" project, coordinated by the Fundación Biodiversidad, ran from 2012 to 2018 across 33 special areas of conservation for the species. Its objectives included scientific research on the desman (including biology and predation), population protection, habitat restoration, and public awareness activities.

A central component of the LIFE+ projects involved the restoration of riparian woodlands. These actions have been associated with increases in benthic invertebrate populations that constitute the desman's food base, as well as benefits for ichthyofauna. Such measures may also support recreational activities, including sport fishing. Additional reported effects include improvements in water balance and water quality in the restored watercourses.

=== Portugal ===
A LIFE project entitled "Natural habitats and flora species of Portugal" was carried out from 1994 to 1997 by the Nature Conservation Institute (ICN). The scientific results of this programme contributed to the preparation of a reference document for species conservation and habitat protection. Its recommendations were subsequently incorporated into the sectoral plan for the Natura 2000 network and transposed into Portuguese legislation.

Since the mid-2000s, further scientific studies have refined knowledge of the species, particularly with regard to its geographic distribution and the effects of hydroelectric dams.

In 2014, a report by the Institute for Nature Conservation and Biodiversity assessed the desman's conservation status in Portugal as unfavourable and identified it as a priority species. The report also identified an emerging threat linked to the spread of invasive plant species, including silver wattle and tree of heaven.

In the same year, an action plan was initiated with the establishment of a monitoring network for the species in northern Portugal, with the aim of limiting population decline and habitat loss. The plan also set out several priority measures, including the ecological rehabilitation of dams and artificial reservoirs within the species' range, improvements in water quality, particularly through restrictions on agrochemical use near watercourses, and systematic waste collection along riverbanks. As an umbrella species, conservation actions targeting the desman are expected to benefit a broader range of aquatic biodiversity.

=== Andorra ===
Scientific studies have been carried out since 2002 under the responsibility of the Environment Department of the Andorran government, notably to document and map the species' distribution within the principality.

A 2018 study comparing desman populations over two survey periods, 2000–2003 and 2013–2017, reported a decline of approximately 70% in Andorra and 43% in neighbouring Catalonia. The decline was attributed to several factors, primarily associated with land-use change and urban development, including increased water abstraction, construction activities near riverbeds, modifications in hydroelectric dam management, and episodes of severe flooding. No clear relationship with climate change effects was identified.

In 2019, the Andorran government considered draft legislation to establish a restoration plan for threatened species, including the desman, and to integrate such species more systematically into environmental impact assessment procedures.

== Human relations ==
=== History ===
Although it is widespread in the Pyrenees, a mountain range inhabited by humans for centuries, the Pyrenean desman has remained poorly known and was long associated with unsubstantiated beliefs. Accounts collected in the late 19th and early 20th centuries from Pyrenean rural communities report claims that the desman hunts trout and feeds on fresh fish. Other testimonies state that, in summer, desmans could be observed sleeping in the shade of haystacks in open fields. Such accounts are generally regarded as elements of local folklore rather than information based on verified observations. Proposed explanations include confusion with other small rodents or semi-aquatic mammals that are more frequently encountered, as well as a tendency to label unfamiliar species as pests in order to justify their removal.

The near absence of the desman from Pyrenean toponymy, in contrast to other widespread species such as the brown bear or the chamois, has likewise been interpreted as evidence of its limited recognition by local populations.

Until the 1990s, anglers commonly but incorrectly accused the species of preying on trout and other fish valued for consumption. These perceptions stemmed from limited knowledge of the species and its diet, as well as from inaccurate articles in popular natural history publications, including photographs of captive desmans that had been fed fish.

=== Scientific knowledge ===
The Pyrenean desman remained largely unknown to scientists until the early 19th century, when it was formally described and classified by Étienne Geoffroy Saint-Hilaire on the basis of several dead specimens. Subsequent research was limited. Studies by Eugène Trutat in 1891 and by Puisségur in the 1930s focused mainly on the anatomy of a small number of captured individuals, as the species proved difficult to observe in the wild and could not be successfully bred in captivity. In the 1950s, Peyre managed to keep desmans alive in captivity without achieving reproduction and proposed interpretations of their behaviour and diet that were later shown to be incomplete or inaccurate. At that time, observations were almost exclusively based on captive animals, and the species' life cycle in its natural environment remained poorly understood.

Comprehensive scientific studies in natural settings began only in the 1980s, addressing the species' distribution, habitat, and diet, which had previously been the subject of speculation. In the 21st century, significant gaps in knowledge persist. For example, extensive LIFE+ research conducted between 2015 and 2020 demonstrated that many individuals exhibit nomadic behaviour, whereas the species had previously been considered predominantly sedentary and territorial. Key demographic parameters, including birth and mortality rates, remain unknown, preventing reliable modelling and prediction of population dynamics. Estimating population size therefore continues to present methodological challenges.

=== In culture ===
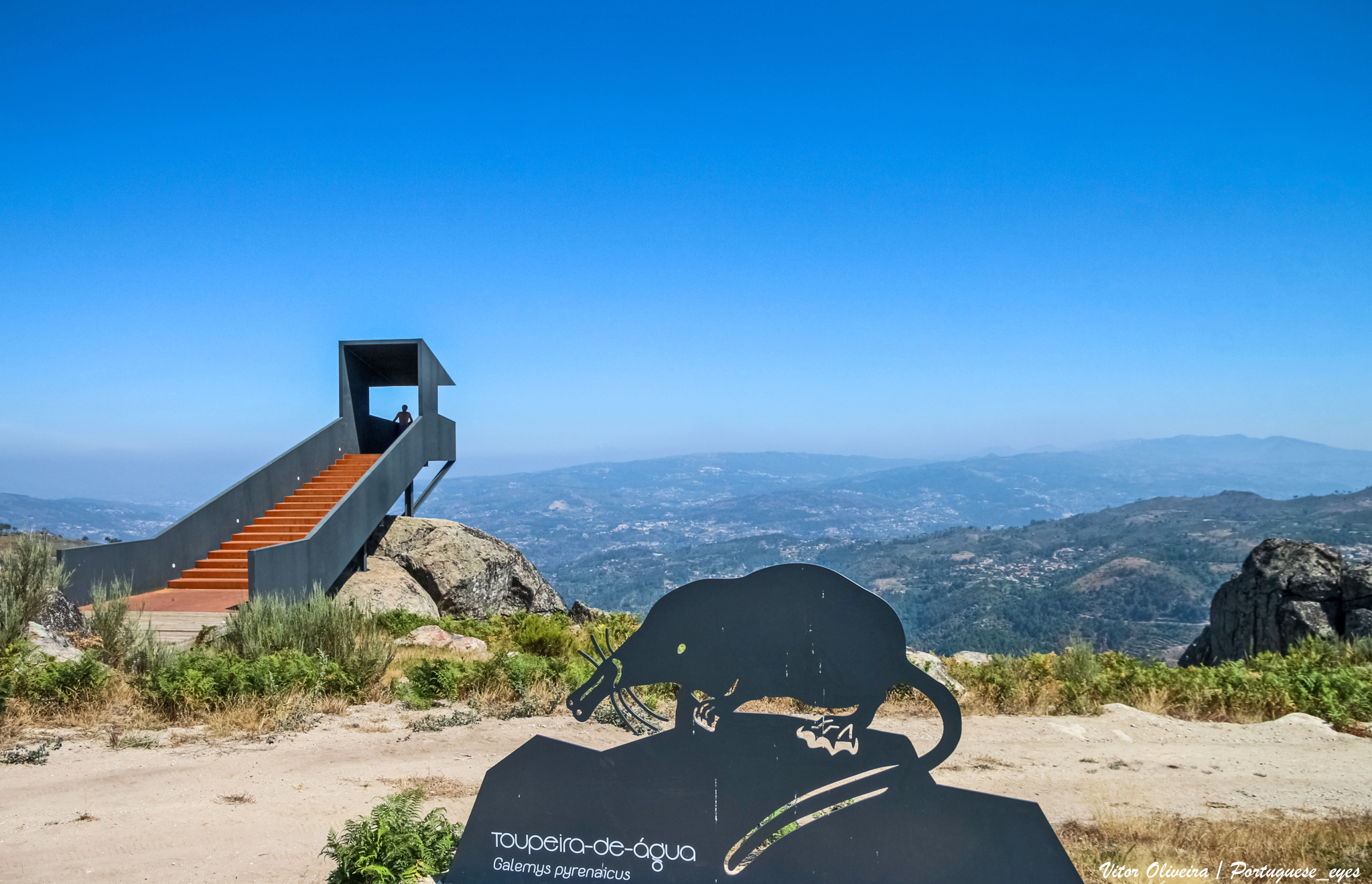
Artwork depicting a desman at the Marcelim Nature Observatory, Portugal.

In the 21st century, the Pyrenean desman remains little known to the general public. Since the 2000s, however, its visibility in Pyrenean regions has increased, largely as a result of public awareness initiatives associated with national action plans and LIFE+ programmes aimed at residents and tourists. Numerous educational activities have been developed, particularly for schoolchildren, using the species as a tool for environmental education and species conservation.

The desman has increasingly been presented as an emblematic species of the Pyrenees, alongside animals such as the brown bear and the chamois. In this context, it is used as a flagship species to promote the protection of mountain biodiversity, notably through travelling exhibitions such as the "Desman caravan", organised since 2015, and the "Piribus", which has toured the French and Spanish slopes since 2019.

Since 2013, a character named Joan Desman has served as the mascot of the Les Angles ski resort in the Pyrénées-Orientales. The Béarn magazine PAG has also adopted the species as its mascot. In addition, the Pyrenean desman features as the main character in several comic books. A statue representing the species has been installed at the entrance to the tourist site of Étang de Lers, in Ariège.

In May 2018, the Pyrenean desman became the 8,000th animal photographed for the Photo Ark project by National Geographic.

== See also ==
- Pyrenean brook salamander
- List of mammals of France
- List of mammals of Spain

== Bibliography ==
=== Dedicated books and encyclopaedias ===
- Geoffroy Saint-Hilaire, Étienne (1811). "Mémoire sur les espèces des Genres Musaraigne et Mygale" [Memoir on the species of the Genera Shrew and Tarantula]. Annales du Muséum d'histoire naturelle (in French). 17: 193.
- Richard, Bernard (1989). Le desman des Pyrénées, un mammifère inconnu à découvrir [The Pyrenean desman, an unknown mammal waiting to be discovered] (in French). Éditions du Rocher. p. 117. ISBN 2-268-00466-X.
- Blanc, Frédéric; Némoz, Mélanie (2018). Desman des Pyrénées [Pyrenean Desman] (in French). Illustrator: Aurélie Calmet; Photographer: Lucas Santucci. Editions du Desman Masqué. p. 130. ISBN 978-2-9513828-4-8.
- Dendaletche, Claude (1997). Les Pyrénées. La vie sauvage en montagne et celle des hommes [The Pyrenees. Wildlife in the mountains and human life]. Guide du naturaliste (in French). Paris: Delachaux et Niestlé. p. 336. ISBN 2-603-01044-1.
- Barret, P.; MacDonald, D. (1999). Guide complet des Mammifères de France et d'Europe [Complete Guide to the Mammals of France and Europe] (in French). Translator: Michel Cuisin. Lausanne/Paris: Delachaux et Niestlé. p. 304. ISBN 2-603-00986-9.
- Wilson, Don E.; Reeder, DeeAnn M. (2005). Mammal Species of the World: A Taxonomic and Geographic Reference. Johns Hopkins University Press. p. 2000. ISBN 978-0-8018-8221-0.
- Wrobel, Murray (2007). Elsevier's Dictionary of Mammals: In Latin, English, German, French and Italian. Elsevier. p. 857. ISBN 978-0-444-51877-4.

=== Scientific publications ===
- Argaud, R. (1944). "Signification anatomique de la trompe du Desman des Pyrénées (Galemys pyrenaicus)" [Anatomical significance of the trunk of the Pyrenean desman (Galemys pyrenaicus)]. Mammalia (in French). 8 (1): 1–6. doi:10.1515/mamm.1944.8.1.1.
- Peyre, A. (1955). "Intersexualité du tractus génital femelle du Desman des Pyrénées (Galemys pyrenaicus G.)" [Intersexuality of the female genital tract of the Pyrenean desman (Galemys pyrenaicus G.)]. Bulletin de la Société Zoologique de France (in French). 80: 132–138.
- Peyre, A. (1956). "Écologie et biogéographie du desman (Galemys pyrenaicus G.) dans les Pyrénées françaises" [Ecology and biogeography of the Pyrenean desman (Galemys pyrenaicus G.) in the French Pyrenees]. Mammalia (in French). 20 (4): 405–418. doi:10.1515/mamm.1956.20.4.405.
- Peyre, A. (1957). "La formule chromosomique du desman des Pyrénées (Galemys pyrenaicus)" [The chromosome formula of the Pyrenean desman (Galemys pyrenaicus)]. Bulletin de la Société Zoologique de France (in French). 82 (5–6): 434–437.
- Combes, C.; Salvayre, H. (1964). "Sur la capture de Galemys pyrenaicus Geoffr. dans une grotte de L'Aude" [On the capture of Galemys pyrenaicus Geoffr. in a cave in L'Aude]. Annales de Spéléologie (in French). 19 (4).
- Richard, B.; Valette-Viallard, A. (1969). "Le desman des Pyrénées (Galemys pyrenaicus). Premières notes sur sa biologie" [The Pyrenean desman (Galemys pyrenaicus). Initial notes on its biology.]. Terre et Vie (in French). 23: 225–245.
- Beron, P. (1971). "Sur quelques acariens parasites des Mammifères et des reptiles de France" [On some parasitic mites of mammals and reptiles in France]. Bulletin de l'Institut Zoologique de Toulouse (in French). 107: 98–99.
- Richard, B. (1973). "Le desman des Pyrénées (Galemys pyrenaicus). Mode de Vie. Univers sensoriel" [The Pyrenean desman (Galemys pyrenaicus). Lifestyle. Sensory world.]. Mammalia (in French). 37 (1): 1–16. doi:10.1515/mamm.1973.37.1.1.
- Richard, B.; Micheau, C. (1975). "Le carrefour trachéen dans l'adaptation du Desman des Pyrénées (Galemys pyrenaicus) à la vie dulçaquicole" [The tracheal crossroads in the adaptation of the Pyrenean desman (Galemys pyrenaicus) to freshwater life]. Mammalia. 39 (3): 467–478. doi:10.1515/mamm.1975.39.3.467.
- Richard, B. (1976). "Extension en France du Desman des Pyrénées (Galemys pyrenaicus) et son environnement" [Distribution of the Pyrenean desman (Galemys pyrenaicus) in France and its environment] (PDF). Bulletin Ecologie (in French). 7 (3): 327–334.
- Richard, B. (1976). "Détermination de l'âge et de la longévité chez le Desman des Pyrénées (Galemys pyrenaicus)" [Determination of age and longevity in the Pyrenean desman (Galemys pyrenaicus)]. Terre et Vie (in French). 30: 181–192.
- Richard, B. (1981). "L'occupation de l'espace à trois dimensions par le desman des Pyrénées, Galemys pyrenaicus, Insectivora, Talpidae" [The occupation of three-dimensional space by the Pyrenean desman, Galemys pyrenaicus, Insectivora, Talpidae]. Italian Journal of Zoology (in French). 48 (3–4): 329–334.
- Santamarina, J.; Guitian, J. (1988). "Quelques données sur le régime alimentaire du desman (Galemys pyrenaicus) dans le nord-ouest de l'Espagne" [Some data on the diet of the Pyrenean desman (Galemys pyrenaicus) in northwestern Spain] (PDF). Mammalia (in French). 52 (3): 301–308. doi:10.1515/mamm-1988-0301.
- Bertrand, Alain (1993). "Répartition géographique du Desman des Pyrénées Galemys pyrenaicus dans les Pyrénées françaises" [Geographical distribution of the Pyrenean desman Galemys pyrenaicus in the French Pyrenees] (PDF). Proceedings of the Meeting on the Pyrenean Desman (in French). Lisbon: 41–52.
- Alvarez, F.; Gijon-Botella, H. (1994). "Paracuaria hispanica N. sp. (Nematoda : Acuariidae), a stomach parasite of the Pyrenean desman Galemys pyrenaicus Geoffr. (Insectivora: Talpidae), with a redefinition of the genus Paracuaria Rao, 1951". Systematic Parasitology. 29 (2). et al.: 105–112. doi:10.1007/BF00009806.
- Gonzalez-Esteban, Jorge; Villate, Idoia; Castién, Enrique (2003). "Sexual identification of Galemys pyrenaicus". Acta Theriologica. 48 (4): 571–573. doi:10.1007/BF03192502.
- Cabria, María Teresa; Rubines, Jonathan; Gómez-Moliner, Benjamín; Zardoya, Rafael (2006). "On the phylogenetic position of a rare Iberian endemic mammal, the Pyrenean desman (Galemys pyrenaicus)". Gene. 375: 1–13. doi:10.1016/j.gene.2006.01.038. ISSN 0378-1119. PMID 16624502.
- López-Fuster, María José; García-Perea, Rosa; Fernández-Salvador, Rosa; Gisbert, Julio; Ventura, Jacint (2006). "Craniometric variability of the Iberian Desman, Galemys pyrenaicus (Mammalia: Erinaceomorpha: Talpidae)" (PDF). Folia Zoologica. 55 (1): 29–42.
- Némoz, Mélanie; Bertrand, Alain (2009). Plan national d'actions en faveur du Desman des Pyrénées (Galemys pyrenaicus) 2009-2014 [National Action Plan for the Pyrenean Desman (Galemys pyrenaicus) 2009-2014] (PDF) (in French). Société Française pour l'Étude et la Protection des Mammifères / Ministère de l'Écologie, de l'Énergie, du Développement Durable et de l'Aménagement du Territoire. p. 151.
- Ribas, A.; Feliu, C.; Fons, R.; Casanova, J. C. (2009). "Larval Digeneans of Mammals in Freshwater Invertebrates as Intermediate Hosts". Vie et Milieu - Life and Environment. 59 (2): 209–213.
- Morueta-Holme, Naia; Fløjgaard, Camilla; Svenning, Jens-Christian (2010). "Climate Change Risks and Conservation Implications for a Threatened Small-Range Mammal Species". PLOS ONE. 5 (4) e10360. Bibcode:2010PLoSO...510360M. doi:10.1371/journal.pone.0010360. ISSN 1932-6203. PMC 2861593. PMID 20454451. Morueta2010.
- Melero, Y.; Aymerich, P.; Santulli, G. (2014). "Activity and space patterns of Pyrenean desman (Galemys pyrenaicus) suggest non-aggressive and non-territorial behaviour". European Journal of Wildlife Research. 60 (5). et al.: 707–715. Bibcode:2014EJWR...60..707M. doi:10.1007/s10344-014-0838-8.
- Charbonnel, Anaïs (2015). Influence multi-échelle des facteurs environnementaux dans la répartition du Desman des Pyrénées (Galemys pyrenaicus) en France [Multi-scale influence of environmental factors on the distribution of the Pyrenean desman (Galemys pyrenaicus) in France] (PDF) (PhD thesis) (in French). Institut National Polytechnique de Toulouse. p. 260.
- Biffi, Marjorie (2017). Influence des facteurs environnementaux et des interactions biotiques sur la sélection de l'habitat et le régime alimentaire du Desman des Pyrénées (Galemys pyrenaicus) [Influence of environmental factors and biotic interactions on habitat selection and diet of the Pyrenean desman (Galemys pyrenaicus)] (PhD thesis) (in French). Université Toulouse 3 Paul Sabatier. p. 268.
- Biffi, Marjorie; Gillet, François; Laffaille, Pascal; Colas, Fanny (June 13, 2017). "Novel insights into the diet of the Pyrenean desman (Galemys pyrenaicus) using next-generation sequencing molecular analyses". Journal of Mammalogy. doi:10.1093/jmammal/gyx070. ISSN 0022-2372.
- Querejeta, Marina; Fernández-González, Angel; Romero, Rafael; Castresana, Jose (2017). "Postglacial dispersal patterns and mitochondrial genetic structure of the Pyrenean desman (Galemys pyrenaicus) in the northwestern region of the Iberian Peninsula". Ecology and Evolution. 7 (12): 4486–4495. Bibcode:2017EcoEv...7.4486Q. doi:10.1002/ece3.3034. ISSN 2045-7758. PMC 5478051. PMID 28649358.
- Goudédranche, Kimberley (2018). Mise en place expérimentale de nouvelles méthodes non-invasives de détection du Desman des Pyrénées dans la vallée du Caillan [Experimental implementation of new non-invasive detection methods for the Pyrenean desman in the Caillan valley] (PDF) (Master's thesis) (in French). Fédération des Réserves Naturelles Catalanes - Université de Perpignan Via Domitia. p. 37.
- Hawlitschek, Oliver; Fernández-González, Angel; Balmori-de la Puente, Alfonso; Castresana, Jose (August 14, 2018). "A pipeline for metabarcoding and diet analysis from fecal samples developed for a small semi-aquatic mammal". PLOS ONE. 13 (8) e0201763. Bibcode:2018PLoSO..1301763H. doi:10.1371/journal.pone.0201763. ISSN 1932-6203. PMC 6091967. PMID 30106960.
- Aymerich, Pere; Gosàlbez, Joaquim (2018). "Regresión reciente y general del desmán ibérico en su límite noreste de distribución" [Recent and general decline of the Pyrenean desman at its northeastern distribution limit]. Spanish Journal of Mammalogy (in Spanish). 30: 21–30. doi:10.7325/Galemys.2018.A2.
- Quaglietta, Lorenzo; Beja, Pedro (August 27, 2019). "Direct observations of vertebrate killing and consumption by the endangered Pyrenean desman ( Galemys pyrenaicus )". Mammalia. 83 (5): 479–482. doi:10.1515/mammalia-2018-0111. ISSN 1864-1547.
- Esnaola Illarreta, Amaiur (2020). The spatial and trophic ecology of the Pyrenean desman Galemys pyrenaicus: key factors for conservation (PDF) (PhD thesis). University of the Basque Country, Leioa. p. 224.
- Poncet, É.; Blanc, F.; Lim, M.; Marc, D.; Némoz, M. (2021). "Desman des Pyrénées (Galemys pyrenaicus É. Geoffroy Saint-Hilaire, 1811) 2011-2018: bilan et retours d'expérience sur huit années de capture dans les Pyrénées françaises" [Pyrenean desman (Galemys pyrenaicus É. Geoffroy Saint-Hilaire, 1811) 2011-2018: review and feedback on eight years of trapping in the French Pyrenees]. Naturae (in French). 3 (3): 35–47. doi:10.5852/naturae2021a3.
- Lim, M.; Némoz, M.; Blanc, F.; Poncet, É.; Xéridat, P. (2021). Plan national d'actions en faveur du Desman des Pyrénées Galemys pyrenaicus 2021-2030 [National Action Plan for the Pyrenean Desman (Galemys pyrenaicus) 2021-2030] (PDF) (in French). CEN Occitanie & DREAL Occitanie. p. 119.

=== Youth and general public books ===
- Jean Joubert (1993). À la recherche du rat-trompette [In search of the trumpet rat] (in French). l'école des loisirs. p. 168. ISBN 978-2-211-01878-4.
- Durand, Anne (2004). Desman Charly, le rat trompette [Desman Charly, the trumpet rat] (in French). Illustrator: Xavier Saüt. Imprimerie des 3B. p. 42. ISBN 2-908947-24-2.
- Espinassous, Louis (2010). Trompette et le monstre du lac [Trumpet and the Lake Monster] (in French). Illustrator: Hélène Sorbé. Cairn. ISBN 978-2-914028-06-6.
- Saüt, Bastien (2013). Pschiiit ! le desman [Shhhh! The desman] (in French). Illustrator: Xavier Saüt. Conseil impr. ISBN 978-2-9529025-4-0.
