= Micropotamogale =

Scientific classification
- Kingdom: Animalia
- Phylum: Chordata
- Class: Mammalia
- Order: Afrosoricida
- Suborder: Tenrecomorpha
- Family: Potamogalidae
- Genus: Micropotamogale; Balsac, 1954

Type species
- Micropotamogale lamottei Balsac, 1954

Species
- Micropotamogale ruwenzorii; Micropotamogale lamottei
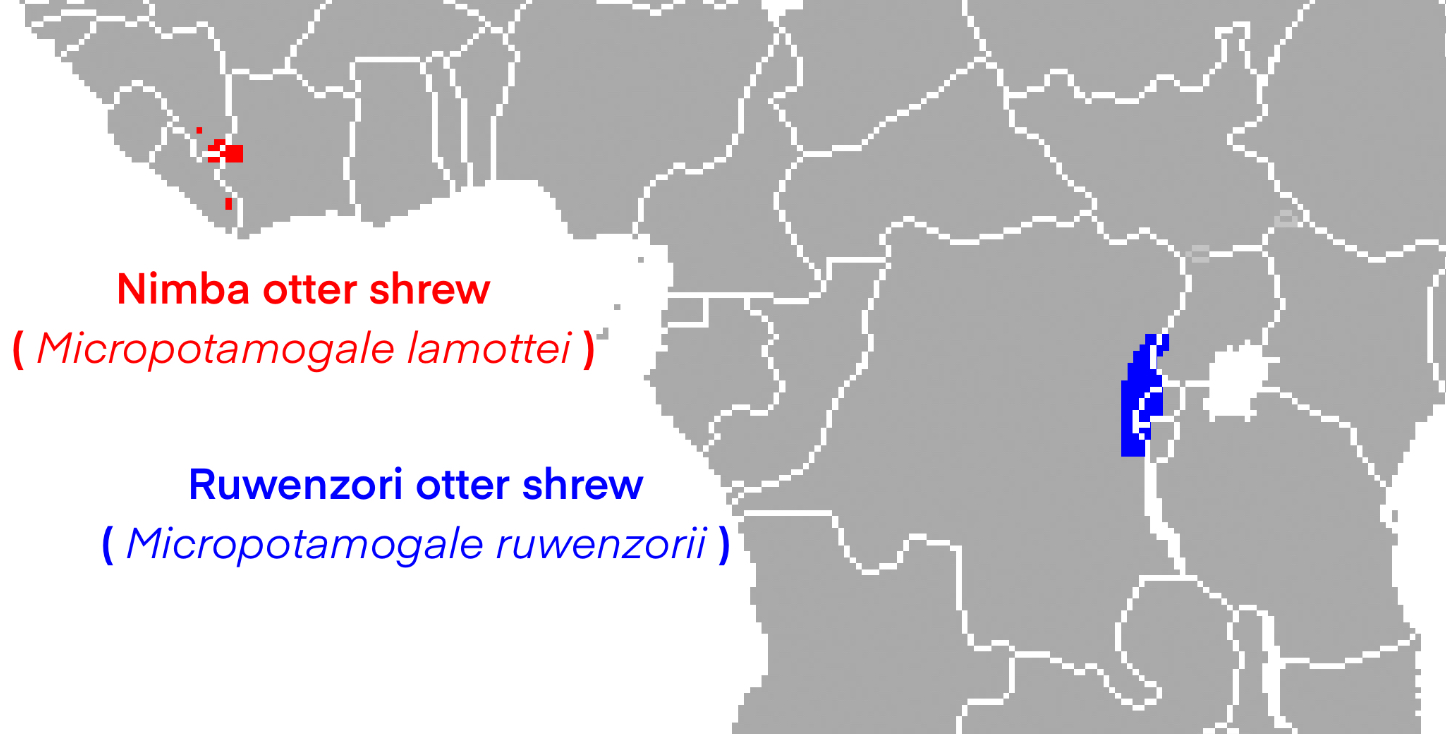

Genus of mammals

Micropotamogale is a genus of afrotheres collectively called dwarf otter shrews native to riverine habitats of West African rainforests. They feed on aquatic animals and insects they can find and capture. They are afrotherian mammals most closely related to the tenrecs of Madagascar, but are not closely related to shrews or otters.

Two species are recognized:

- Ruwenzori otter shrew (Micropotamogale ruwenzorii)
- Nimba otter shrew (Micropotamogale lamottei)

== Conservation ==
The Ruwenzori otter shrew is considered to be of least concern, while the Nimba otter shrew is classified as vulnerable by the IUCN.
