= Ruwenzori otter shrew =

Conservation status
- Least Concern (IUCN 3.1)

Scientific classification
- Kingdom: Animalia
- Phylum: Chordata
- Class: Mammalia
- Order: Afrosoricida
- Suborder: Tenrecomorpha
- Family: Potamogalidae
- Genus: Micropotamogale
- Species: M. ruwenzorii

Binomial name
- Micropotamogale ruwenzorii (de Witte & Frechkop, 1955)
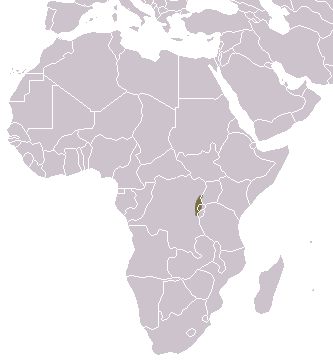
- Ruwenzori otter shrew range

Species of mammal

The Ruwenzori otter shrew (Micropotamogale ruwenzorii) is a species of semiaquatic dwarf otter shrew of the family Potamogalidae. It is found in the Democratic Republic of the Congo, Rwanda, and Uganda. Otter shrews are shrew-like afrotherian mammals found in sub-Saharan Africa. They are most closely related to the tenrecs of Madagascar.

== Behavior and habitat ==
Ruwenzori otter shrews live in the rivers and streams of various biomes, mostly in forests. They also live at various altitudes, ranging from lowland forests just a few hundred meters above sea level to montane forests over 2,000 m (6,600 ft) above sea level. Its prey is primarily small animals, such as fish, crabs, worms, insects, and small frogs. It is threatened by habitat loss.
