= List of Madagascar and Indian Ocean Island species extinct in the Holocene =

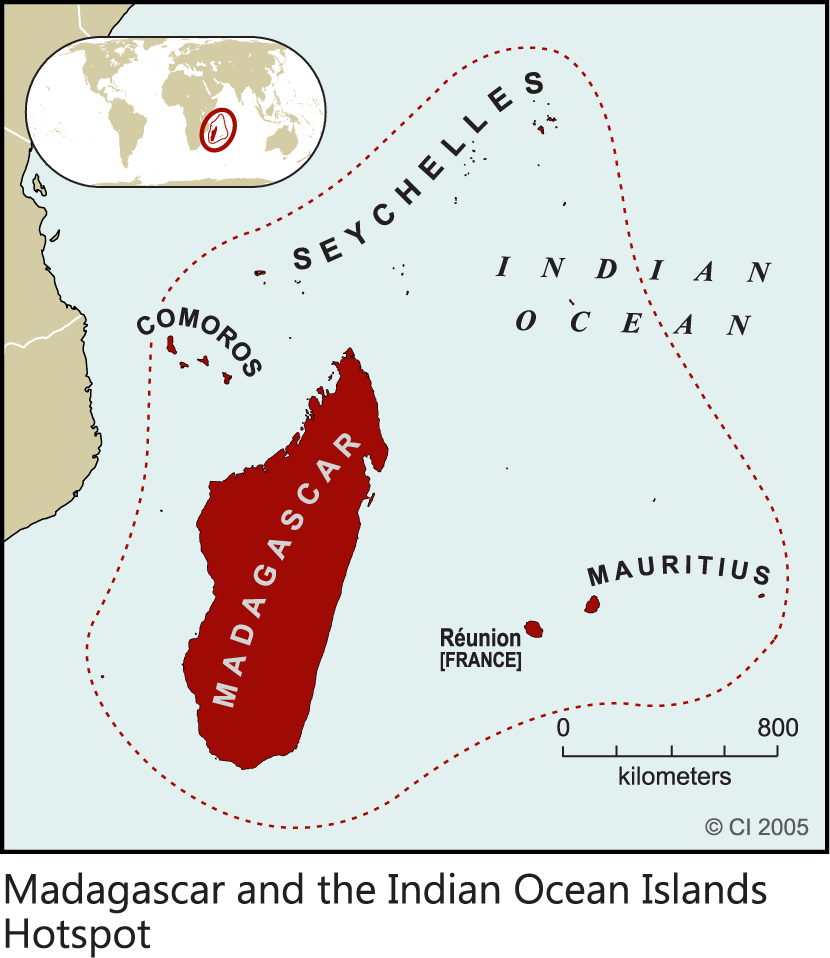

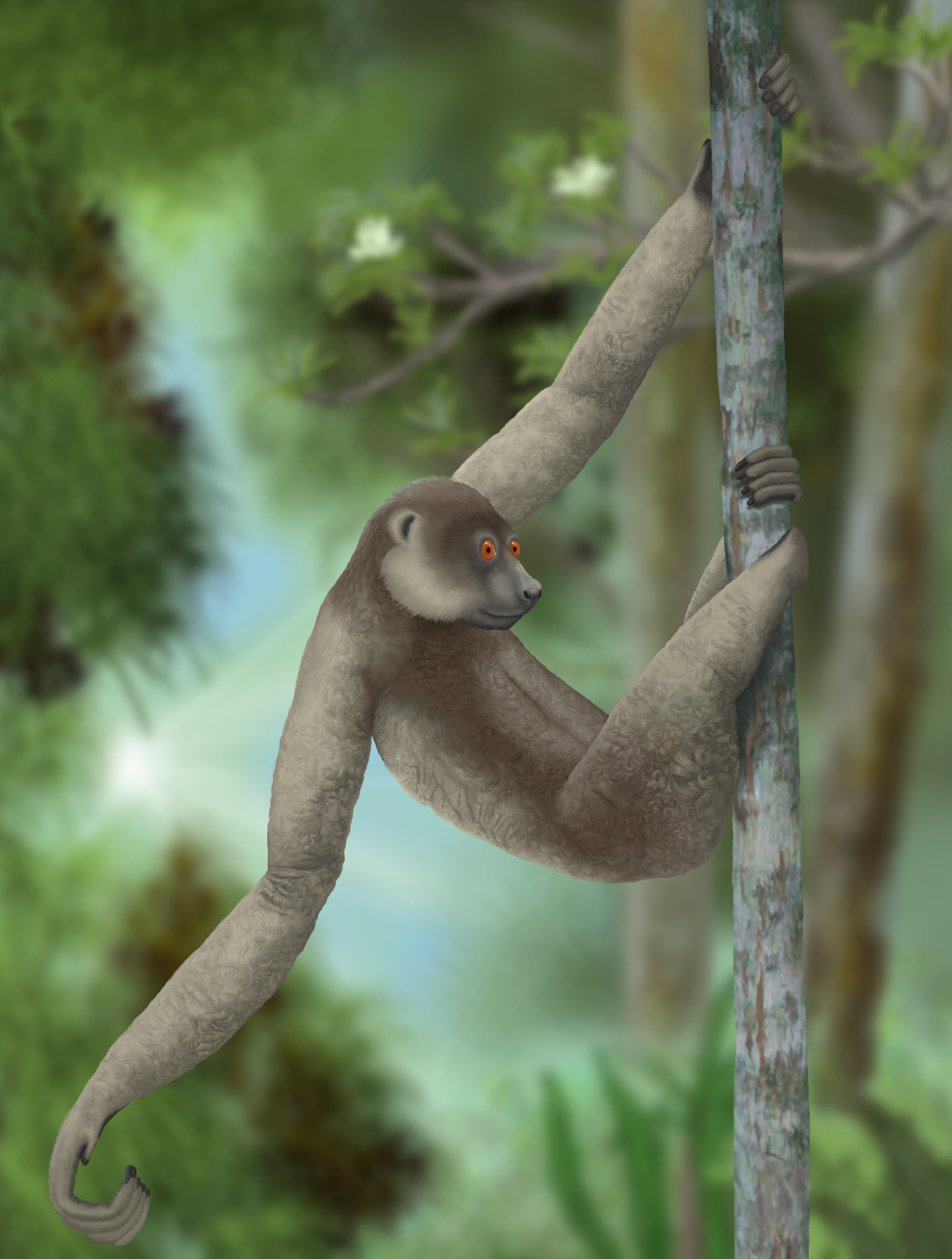
Life restoration of a large sloth lemur (Palaeopropithecus ingens).

This is a list of Madagascar and Indian Ocean Island animals extinct in the Holocene that covers extinctions from the Holocene epoch, a geologic epoch that began about 11,650 years before present (about 9700 BCE) (Note: The source gives "11,700 calendar yr b2k (before CE 2000)". But "BP" means "before CE 1950". Therefore, the Holocene began 11,650 BP. Doing the math, that is c. 9700 BCE.) and continues to the present day.

The Republic of Madagascar is a large island country in the Indian Ocean, off the coast of East Africa. Other Indian Ocean islands near Madagascar include the Mascarene Islands (split between the Republic of Mauritius and the French department of Réunion), the Republic of Seychelles, and the Comoro Islands (split between the Union of Comoros and the French department of Mayotte).

Madagascar and the Indian Ocean islands are a biodiversity hotspot. The wildlife of Madagascar evolved in isolation and is distinct from the wildlife of Africa and other continents. Approximately 90 percent of all plant and animal species found in Madagascar are endemic. Lemurs are endemic to the island of Madagascar.

Numerous animal species have disappeared from Madagascar and the Indian Ocean islands as part of the ongoing Holocene extinction, driven by human activity. The famous dodo (Raphus cucullatus), last seen in 1662, was endemic to Mauritius. All 17 extinct lemurs were giant lemurs larger than the extant lemurs.

The subfossil remains of certain avian orders are scarce on Réunion. Consequently, a few of the extinct birds from Réunion are hypothetical species. They almost certainly existed but lack supporting subfossil remains.

Locally extinct native species are included below, but human-introduced species that were later wiped out are not included.

== Mammals (class Mammalia) ==
=== Afrosoricidans (order Afrosoricida) ===
==== Tenrecs (family Tenrecidae) ====
Common name	Scientific name	Range	Comments
MacPhee's shrew tenrec	Microgale macpheei	Southeastern Madagascar	Only known from cave remains dated to 790-410 BCE.

==== Bibimalagasies (Incertae familiae) ====
Common name	Scientific name	Range	Comments	Pictures
Smaller bibymalagasy	Plesiorycteropus germainepetterae	Madagascar		
Larger bibymalagasy	Plesiorycteropus madagascariensis	Madagascar	Most recent remains dated to 865-965 CE.	

=== Sea cows (order Sirenia) ===
==== Dugongs (family Dugongidae) ====
===== Locally extinct =====
Common name	Scientific name	Range	Comments	Pictures
Dugong	Dugong dugong	Indian Ocean to Taiwan and New Caledonia	Extinct in the Mascarene Islands.	

=== Rodents (order Rodentia) ===
==== Nesomyids (family Nesomyidae) ====
Scientific name	Range	Comments	Pictures
Brachytarsomys mahajambaensis	Northern coast of Madagascar		
Hypogeomys australis	Southeastern and central Madagascar	Most recent remains dated to 428-618 CE. There was no range overlap with its living relative, the Malagasy giant rat.	
Nesomys narindaensis	Northern coast of Madagascar	Known from the Pleistocene, but might have reached the Holocene due to humans arriving in the island later.	

=== Primates (order Primates) ===
==== Aye-ayes (family Daubentoniidae) ====
Common name	Scientific name	Range	Comments
Giant aye-aye	Daubentonia robusta	Madagascar	Most recent remains dated to 900-1150 CE.

==== Koala lemurs (family Megaladapidae) ====
Scientific name	Range	Comments	Pictures
Megaladapis edwardsi	Madagascar	Most recent remains dated to 1300-1430 CE.	
Megaladapis grandidieri	Madagascar	Most recent remains dated to 980-1170 CE.	
Megaladapis madagascariensis	Madagascar	Most recent remains dated to 1206-1427 CE.	

==== Lemurids (family Lemuridae) ====
Common name	Scientific name	Range	Comments	Pictures
Giant ruffed lemurs	Pachylemur insignis	Southwestern Madagascar	Most recent remains dated to 890-990 CE.	
Giant ruffed lemurs	Pachylemur jullyi	Central Madagascar	Known from the Pleistocene but possibly reached the Holocene due to later human arrival in the island.	

==== Monkey lemurs (family Archaeolemuridae) ====
Scientific name	Range	Comments	Pictures
Archaeolemur edwardsii	Madagascar	Most recent remains dated to 1047-1280 CE.	
Archaeolemur majori	Madagascar	Most recent remains dated to 650-780 CE.	
Hadropithecus stenognathus	Madagascar	Most recent remains dated to 535-876 CE.	

==== Sloth lemurs (family Palaeopropithecidae) ====
Scientific name	Range	Comments	Pictures
Archaeoindris fontoynontii	Central Madagascar	Most recent remains dated to 412-199 BCE.	
Babakotia radofilai	Northern Madagascar	Most recent remains dated to 3340-2890 BCE.	
Mesopropithecus dolichobrachion	Northern Madagascar	Known from the Pleistocene but possibly reached the Holocene due to later human arrival in the island.	
Mesopropithecus globiceps	Southwestern Madagascar	Most recent remains dated to 245-429 CE.	
Mesopropithecus pithecoides	Central Madagascar	Most recent remains dated to 600-765 CE.	
Palaeopropithecus ingens	Southwestern Madagascar	Most recent remains dated to 1320-1630 CE.	
Palaeopropithecus kelyus	Northern Madagascar	Known from the Pleistocene but possibly reached the Holocene due to later human arrival in the island.	
Palaeopropithecus maximus	Central Madagascar		

=== Bats (order Chiroptera) ===
==== Megabats (family Pteropodidae) ====
Common name	Scientific name	Range	Comments	Pictures
Small Mauritian flying fox	Pteropus subniger	Mauritius and Réunion	Last recorded in Mauritius in 1859, and in Réunion in 1862. Extinction might have been caused by hunting and deforestation.	

==== Trident bats (family Rhinonycteridae) ====
Scientific name	Range	Comments	Pictures
Triaenops goodmani	Northern Madagascar	Described from three mandibles found in a cave, 10,000 years old or younger. The two other extant species of the genus Triaenops in Madagascar were later moved to Paratriaenops.	

==== Old World leaf-nosed bats (family Hipposideridae) ====
Scientific name	Range	Comments	Pictures
Hipposideros besaoka	Northern Madagascar	Known from numerous jawbones and isolated teeth 10,000 years old or younger.	

==== Vesper bats (family Vespertilionidae) ====
===== Possibly extinct =====
Common name	Scientific name	Range	Comments	Pictures
Lesser yellow bat	Scotophilus borbonicus	Southern Madagascar and Réunion	Last recorded on Madagascar in 1868 and on Réunion around 1880. The causes of extinction are unknown.	

==== Incertae familiae ====
Common name	Scientific name	Range	Comments
Bory's white bat	Boryptera alba	Réunion	Hypothetical species known only from a 1801 description by Jean-Baptiste Bory de Saint-Vincent. It was a small white bat that camouflaged under the leaves of the latan palm and presumably became extinct due to deforestation and predation by introduced rats.

=== Carnivorans (order Carnivora) ===
==== Malagasy carnivorans (family Eupleridae) ====
Common name	Scientific name	Range	Comments	Pictures
	Cryptoprocta bevatabe	Tsimanampesotse National Park, southwestern Madagascar	Most recent remains dated to the early Holocene, before 8,300 years ago. The largest of the three fossa species, speculated to be the "black fossa" (fosa mainty) of Malagasy folklore.	
Giant fossa	Cryptoprocta spelea	Madagascar	Most recent remains were dated to 210 CE. The species, or a folk memory may have survived for longer: Étienne de Flacourt wrote in 1658 that a leopard-like carnivore more powerful than the extant fossa, capable of killing calves and humans, could be found in remote mountain areas. Intermediate between C. bevatabe and the living fossa, it is speculated to be the pale or off-white fossa (fosa ondry) of Malagasy folkore, while the living fossa would be the smaller red fossa (fosa mena).	

=== Even-toed ungulates (order Artiodactyla) ===
==== Hippopotamuses (family Hippopotamidae) ====
Common name	Scientific name	Range	Comments	Pictures
Malagasy hippopotamus	Hippopotamus laloumena	Eastern and northern Madagascar	Most recent remains, of questionable provenance, were dated to 1670-1950 CE; others to 414-262 BCE. A claimed witness from Belo sur Mer described a hippopotamus and imitated its call in 1976.	
Lemerle's dwarf hippopotamus	Hippopotamus lemerlei	Western Madagascar	Most recent remains dated to 670-836 CE.	
Madagascar dwarf hippopotamus	Hippopotamus madagascariensis	Central Madagascar subhumid forests	Most recent remains dated to 687-880 CE.	

== Birds (class Aves) ==
=== Elephant birds (order Aepyornithiformes) ===
==== Greater elephant birds (family Aepyornithidae) ====
Common name	Scientific name	Range	Comments	Pictures
Hildebrandt's elephant bird	Aepyornis hildebrandti	Central and eastern Madagascar	Most recent remains dated to 664-773 CE.	
Giant elephant bird	Aepyornis maximus	Central and southern Madagascar	Most recent remains dated to 1040-1380 CE. A 2018 study moved the largest elephant bird specimens to the genus Vorombe, but a 2023 genetic study regarded Vorombe as synonymous with Aepyornis maximus.	

==== Lesser elephant birds (family Mullerornithidae) ====
Common name	Scientific name	Range	Comments	Pictures
Lesser elephant bird	Mullerornis modestus	Central and southern Madagascar	Most recent remains dated to 680-880 CE.	

=== Waterfowl (order Anseriformes) ===
==== Ducks, geese, and swans (family Anatidae) ====
Common name	Scientific name	Range	Comments	Pictures
Réunion sheldgoose	Alopochen kervazoi	Réunion	Last recorded in 1671-1672.	
Mauritius sheldgoose	Alopochen mauritiana	Mauritius	Last recorded in 1693.	
Malagasy shelduck	Alopochen sirabensis	Madagascar	Most recent remains dated to 530-860 CE.	
Stout-legged duck	cf. Anas bernieri	Rodrigues	Known from a single subfossil femur. A 1601 reference to "geese" in the island may refer to this unnamed species.	
Mascarene teal	Anas theodori	Mauritius and Réunion	Last recorded in Mauritius around 1700 and in 1710 on Réunion.	
Réunion pochard	cf. Aythya innotata	Réunion	Known from subfossil bones, it was possibly referenced in texts from 1687 and 1710 mentioning sarcelles et canards.	
Malagasy sheldgoose	Centrornis majori	Central Madagascar	Occurred alongside the smaller Malagasy shelduck until possibly the 14th or 15th centuries CE, when it disappeared due to hunting and aridification.	
Amsterdam wigeon	Mareca marecula	Île Amsterdam	Possibly recorded in 1696. Otherwise known from subfossil bones. It could have been hunted to extinction by sealers or exterminated by introduced rats.	
St. Paul wigeon	Mareca sp.	Île Saint-Paul	Only known from John Barrow's 1807 description and a possible 1793 painting. It was similar looking but likely distinct from the Amsterdam wigeon due to the distance between the islands, with both species evolving flightlessness separately. The species could have been hunted to extinction, as it was noted to be the "favorite food" of five sealers who lived in the island for several years.	

=== Flamingos (order Phoenicopteriformes) ===
==== Flamingos (family Phoenicopteridae) ====
===== Locally extinct =====
Common name	Scientific name	Range	Comments	Pictures
Greater flamingo	Phoenicopterus roseus	Africa, Mediterranean region, and South Asia	Hunted to extinction in the Mascarene Islands, disappearing from Réunion by 1730 and from Mauritius by 1770. Only stragglers were present in Rodrigues. The Mauritius "géant" mentioned by François Leguat in 1708 was probably a flamingo and not an endemic bird species as sometimes considered. Survives in Madagascar.	

=== Grebes (order Podicipediformes) ===
==== Grebes (family Podicipedidae) ====
Common name	Scientific name	Range	Comments	Pictures
Alaotra grebe	Tachybaptus rufolavatus	Lake Alaotra, Madagascar	Last seen in 1985. Declined due to hunting, introduction of invasive species of Tilapia, Micropterus salmoides and Channa striata; conversion of marsh areas for agriculture, soil erosion and sedimentation from deforestation. The last individuals hybridized with little grebes arrived from Africa.	

=== Cuckoos (order Cuculiformes) ===
==== Cuckoos (family Cuculidae) ====
Common name	Scientific name	Range	Comments	Pictures
Assumption Island coucal	Centropus toulou assumptionis	Assumption Island, Seychelles	Last recorded in the 1920s. Some authors don't consider it different from the Madagascar subspecies. The Assumption population likely disappeared as a result of extensive guano mining. Afterwards, the island was colonized by the Aldabra subspecies C. t. insularis.	
Bertha's coua	Coua berthae	Madagascar	Known from subfossil remains larger than any other coua. It was possibly also the heaviest and completely terrestrial, which would have made it vulnerable to hunting.	
Delalande's coua	Coua delalandei	Nosy Boraha Island and Point-à-Larré, Madagascar	Last collected in 1834. Reports from 1930 are unfounded. The species likely disappeared as a result of extensive deforestation, though hunting and predation by introduced rats could also have contributed.	
Ancient coua	Coua primaeva	Madagascar	Known from a large tarsometatarsus dated to 110 BCE - 130 CE. It could have been hunted.	

=== Pigeons and doves (order Columbiformes) ===
==== Pigeons and doves (family Columbidae) ====
Common name	Scientific name	Range	Comments	Pictures
Mauritius blue pigeon	Alectroenas nitidissimus	Mauritius	Last confirmed individual was killed in 1826, though it might have survived in remote areas until 1837. As the species persisted for two centuries after settlement, it probably wasn't driven to extinction by introduced predators, but mainly because of deforestation.	
Rodrigues blue pigeon	Alectroenas payandeei	Rodrigues	Only known from a single, subfossil tarsometatarsus and possibly a femur. It was larger than any other Alectroenas species except the Mauritian one. Probably disappeared before Leguat arrived to the island in the 1690s.	
Réunion blue pigeon	Alectroenas sp.	Réunion	Last reported in 1671-1672. Considered a hypothetical species: it almost certainly existed but lacks supporting fossil remains. Probably disappeared due to hunting and predation by introduced cats.	
Providence blue pigeon	Alectroenas sp.	Islands St. Pierre and Providence, Seychelles	Only known from a description made in 1821-1822.	
Mauritian wood pigeon	Columba thiriouxi	Mauritius	Described from subfossil remains, it is believed to have become extinct by 1730 due to hunting, predation by introduced black rats, and deforestation. The species has been questioned due to the material being scarce and not completely distinguishable from rock doves introduced to the island in 1639. However, early historical accounts mention the existence of pigeons that were caught with ease.	
Mauritian turtle dove	Nesoenas cicur	Mauritius	Similar to the Malagasy turtle dove but more terrestrial, with more robust legs and smaller wings. Disappeared by 1730 due to hunting, predation by introduced mammals, and deforestation. The Madagascar turtle dove was introduced in 1770 and mistakenly described as a native later.	
Réunion pink pigeon	Nesoenas duboisi	Réunion	Larger than the Mauritian species, it was last reported in 1704. Disappeared due to predation by introduced black rats and cats.	
Amirante turtle dove	Nesoenas picturata aldabrana	Amirante Islands of Seychelles	Probably extinct due to hybridization with introduced Malagasy turtle dove. Pure individuals were last reported in the 1950s.	
Seychelles turtle dove	Nesoenas picturata rostrata	Seychelles	Probably extinct due to hybridization with Malagasy turtle dove.	
Rodrigues pigeon	Nesoenas rodericanus	Rodrigues	A small species known from subfossil bones found in caves along with remains of Rodrigues solitaires. It disappeared between 1726 and 1761 due to predation by rats.	
Rodrigues solitaire	Pezophaps solitaria	Rodrigues	Last reported in 1761. It was heavily hunted and also predated on by introduced cats.	
Dodo	Raphus cucullatus	Mauritius	Possibly disappeared from the main island by the 1640s already, during the first period of Dutch settlement (1638-1658). Later reports may actually refer to the red rail, though the ones from offshore islands in 1662 and 1688 could be genuine. Though hunted, settlers were few and the primary cause of extinction may have been predation by introduced mammals like black rats, pigs, goats, and monkeys.	

=== Mesites (order Mesitornithiformes) ===
==== Mesites (family Mesitornithidae) ====
Scientific name	Range	Comments
Monias sp.	Madagascar	Prehistoric

=== Rails and cranes (order Gruiformes) ===
==== Rails (family Rallidae) ====
Common name	Scientific name	Range	Comments	Pictures
Red rail	Aphanapteryx bonasia	Mauritius	Last recorded in 1693. Presumably hunted to extinction, although introduced cats could also have taken some birds.	
Réunion rail	Dryolimnas augusti	Réunion	Last recorded in 1674. Presumably driven to extinction by hunting, and predation by rats and cats.	
Cheke's wood rail	Dryolimnas chekei	Mauritius	Possibly mentioned in a 1602 document. A fightless descendant of the white-throated rail, which is a rare vagrant in Mauritius. It quickly disappeared due to hunting and predation by introduced mammals.	
Assumption white-throated rail	Dryolimnas cuvieri abbotti	Assumption Island, Seychelles	Last recorded in 1908. Disappeared due to habitat destruction caused by guano mining and predation by introduced rats.	
Rodrigues rail	Erythromachus leguati	Rodrigues	Last recorded in 1726. It was hunted to extinction.	
Mascarene coot	Fulica newtonii	Mauritius and Réunion	Last recorded on Réunion in 1672 and on Mauritius in 1693. Presumed hunted to extinction.	
Hova gallinule	Hovacrex roberti	Madagascar	Known from subfossil remains.	
Réunion swamphen	Porphyrio caerulescens	Réunion	Last recorded around 1730 and presumably hunted to extinction. Considered a hypothetical species: it almost certainly existed but lacks supporting fossil remains.	
Seychelles swamphen	Porphyrio sp.	Seychelles	Last reported in 1775. It likely was exterminated by introduced rats or cats. No remains survive.	

=== Shorebirds (order Charadriiformes) ===
==== Plovers, dotterels, and lapwings (family Charadriidae) ====
Common name	Scientific name	Range	Comments
Malagasy lapwing	Vanellus madagascariensis	Madagascar	Known from subfossil bones. Believed to have become extinct around the 14th century as a result of habitat contraction caused by aridification.

=== Albatrosses and petrels (order Procellariiformes) ===
==== Petrels and shearwaters (family Procellariidae) ====
Common name	Scientific name	Range	Comments
Bourne's petrel	Pterodroma sp.	Rodrigues	Named after unpublished subfossil remains. Presumed extinct in 1726-1761.

===== Locally extinct =====
Common name	Scientific name	Range	Comments	Pictures
Mascarene petrel	Pseudobulweria aterrima	Mascarene Islands	Survived the introduction of rats in Rodrigues but disappeared with the arrival of cats in 1726-1761. A dead bird was found in Mauritius in 2002, presumed to have dispersed from Réunion. Survives but is critically endangered in Réunion.	

=== Boobies, cormorants, and relatives (order Suliformes) ===
==== Boobies and gannets (family Sulidae) ====
===== Locally extinct =====
Common name	Scientific name	Range	Comments	Pictures
Abbott's booby	Papasula abbotti	Indian and Pacific oceanic islands, from the Seychelles and Mascarenes to the Northern Marianas and Marquesas Islands	Last recorded in Mauritius around 1670, Rodrigues in 1832, and Seychelles in 1908. The species was described from a bird collected in either Assumption or the Glorioso Islands in 1892. Vagrants from Christmas Island (only surviving breeding population) visited Chagos until 1996. It seems to have disappeared from Mauritius due to nest raiding by introduced monkeys, with old birds persisting for a time after rearing young became impossible. It likely was hunted to extinction in Rodrigues, where it was held as the only seabird worthy of human consumption in the 18th century. In Seychelles, it disappeared due to a combination of hunting and habitat destruction through deforestation and guano mining. Examination of subfossil remains from the Mascarenes indicates that the local population was distinct.	
Red-footed booby	Sula sula	Oceanic circumglobal between the Tropic of Cancer and the Tropic of Capricorn	Hunted to extinction in Rodrigues in 1874. Extinct as resident but still vagrant in Mauritius. Survives in Réunion, Madagascar, and Seychelles.	

==== Cormorants and shags (family Phalacrocoracidae) ====
Common name	Scientific name	Range	Comments
Madagascar cormorant	Phalacrocorax sp.	Madagascar	Prehistoric

===== Locally extinct, cormorants and shags (family Phalacrocoracidae) =====
Common name	Scientific name	Range	Comments	Pictures
Reed cormorant	Microcarbo africanus	Sub-Saharan Africa, Madagascar, Mauritius and Réunion	Extinct in Mauritius and Réunion. Last recorded on Réunion in 1705, where the young were considered good to eat. It survived the introduction of rats and pigs, but disappeared when cats were introduced. No historical mentions from Mauritius but subfossils were found at the Mare aux Songes. The Mascarene remains are distinct and smaller, possibly representing a third subspecies after the African and Malagasy ones.	

=== Pelicans, herons, and ibises (order Pelecaniformes) ===
==== Ibises and spoonbills (family Threskiornithidae) ====
Common name	Scientific name	Range	Comments	Pictures
Réunion ibis	Threskiornis solitarius	Réunion	Last recorded in 1763. Hunting was the likely cause of extinction.	

==== Herons (family Ardeidae) ====
Common name	Scientific name	Range	Comments	Pictures
Réunion night heron	Nycticorax duboisi	Réunion	Last recorded in 1674. Likely hunted to extinction.	
Mauritius night heron	Nycticorax mauritianus	Mauritius	Last recorded in 1693. Likely hunted to extinction.	
Rodrigues night heron	Nycticorax megacephalus	Rodrigues	Last recorded in 1726. Likely hunted to extinction.	

===== Locally extinct, herons (family Ardeidae) =====
Common name	Scientific name	Range	Comments	Pictures
Western reef heron (Note: The population in this region has previously been considered a separate species, the dimorphic egret E. dimorpha.)	Egretta gularis	Coastal tropical and subtropical Africa, southwest Asia, and Madagascar	Last recorded on Mauritius in 1602 and on Réunion in 1705. Survives on Madagascar and is a common vagrant on other Indian Ocean islands.	

==== Pelicans (family Pelecanidae) ====
===== Locally extinct =====
Common name	Scientific name	Range	Comments	Pictures
Pink-backed pelican	Pelecanus rufescens	Subsaharan Africa and western Madagascar	Bred in the Antsalova region of Madagascar until the 1950s-1960s. Vagrants were last seen on Lake Bedo in 2004.	

=== Hawks and relatives (order Accipitriformes) ===
==== Hawks, eagles, kites, harriers and Old World vultures (family Accipitridae) ====
Common name	Scientific name	Range	Comments
	Aquila sp. "large"	Madagascar	Known from subfossil remains. It is unknown if they represent endemic species or populations of eagle species surviving outside Madagascar.
	Aquila sp. "small"	Madagascar	Known from subfossil remains. It is unknown if they represent endemic species or populations of eagle species surviving outside Madagascar.
Malagasy crowned eagle	Stephanoaetus mahery	Madagascar	Most recent remains dated to 3630-3570 BCE.

===== Locally extinct, hawks, eagles, kites, harriers and Old World vultures (family Accipitridae) =====
Common name	Scientific name	Range	Comments	Pictures
Réunion harrier	Circus maillardi	Mauritius and Réunion	Last recorded on Mauritius in 1606. It is unclear why it survived on Réunion only.	

=== Owls (order Strigiformes) ===
==== True owls (family Strigidae) ====
Common name	Scientific name	Range	Comments	Pictures
Réunion scops owl	Otus grucheti	Réunion	Only known from subfossil remains. Presumed to have become extinct in the 18th century as a result of deforestation.	
Rodrigues scops owl	Otus murivorus	Rodrigues	Last recorded in 1726. It could have disappeared due to deforestation or predation by introduced rats and cats.	
Mauritius scops owl	Otus sauzieri	Mauritius	Last claimed sighting (second-hand) in 1837. It likely disappeared as a result of increased deforestation, as it survived for two centuries after potential predatory mammals were introduced.	

=== Kingfishers and relatives (order Coraciiformes) ===
==== Ground rollers (family Brachypteraciidae) ====
Common name	Scientific name	Range	Comments
Ampoza ground roller	Brachypteracias langrandi	Southwest Madagascar	Only known from a single humerus fossil discovered in 1929. It could have disappeared due to aridification.

=== Falcons (order Falconiformes) ===
==== Falcons and caracaras (family Falconidae) ====
Common name	Scientific name	Range	Comments
Réunion kestrel	Falco duboisi	Réunion	Last recorded in 1671-1672. The reasons of extinction are unknown, but presumed human-induced.

=== Parrots (order Psittaciformes) ===
==== Old World parrots (family Psittaculidae) ====
Common name	Scientific name	Range	Comments	Pictures
Broad-billed parrot	Lophopsittacus mauritianus	Mauritius	Last recorded in 1673-1675. It was likely hunted to extinction. Though large and a poor flier, it was also ill-tempered and apparently capable of fighting introduced mammals.	
Mascarene parrot	Mascarinus mascarinus	Réunion	Carl Wilhelm Hahn's 1834 claim that he had seen the last individual alive in the menagerie of Maximilian I Joseph of Bavaria is usually cited as the last known instance of this species. However, the observation itself was not dated and could have happened decades before. In fact, Maximilian I died in 1825, and when his animals were auctioned the following year, no mascarene parrot was listed among them. Hahn's illustration of the bird also appears to have been copied from a 50 years older painting. The species was otherwise last mentioned in the wild in the 1770s, and in captivity in Europe in 1784.	
Réunion parrot	Necropsittacus? borbonicus	Réunion	Only known from Sieur Dubois's 1671-1672 description. Considered a hypothetical species: it almost certainly existed but lacks supporting fossil remains. Lionel Walter Rothschild's assignation of the species to the genus Necropsittacus in 1907 is unsupported.	
Rodrigues parrot	Necropsittacus rodricanus	Rodrigues	Last recorded in 1761. It was likely hunted to extinction. Other possible causes include deforestation and predation by introduced rats and cats.	
Seychelles parakeet	Palaeornis wardi	Mahé, Silhouette and Praslin, Seychelles	Last known individual was killed in 1893. Disappeared due to habitat clearing for coconut plantations, shooting and trapping to protect crops.	
Mascarene grey parakeet	Psittacula bensoni	Mauritius and Réunion	Last recorded on Réunion in 1732 and on Mauritius in 1759. It was hunted for food and to protect crops. Its final disappearance coincides with large scale clearing of forests for agriculture with slash and burn tactics. All surviving material is from Mauritius as no individuals from Réunion were collected and preserved.	
Réunion parakeet	Psittacula eques eques	Réunion	Last recorded in 1732. Only known from contemporary paintings and descriptions of mounted specimens, now lost.	
Newton's parakeet	Psittacula exsul	Rodrigues	Last collected in 1875. By then the species was very rare and the survivors could have been wiped out by a series of cyclones that struck the island in the following years. It was very tame and easy to catch.	

===== Locally extinct, old World parrots (family Psittaculidae) =====
Common name	Scientific name	Range	Comments	Pictures
Grey-headed lovebird	Agapornis canus	Madagascar and Seychelles	Extirpated from Seychelles. An introduced population from Mauritius is also extinct. Survives in Madagascar and has been successfully introduced to Comoros and Mayotte.	

=== Passerines (order Passeriformes) ===
==== Reed warblers (family Acrocephalidae) ====
Common name	Scientific name	Range	Comments
Aldabra brush warbler	Nesillas aldabrana	Malabar Island, Seychelles	Last recorded in 1983. Likely driven to extinction by habitat degradation caused by introduced goats and tortoises, and predation by cats and rats.

==== Bulbuls (family Pycnonotidae) ====
Common name	Scientific name	Range	Comments
Rodrigues bulbul	Hypsipetes cowlesi	Rodrigues	Known from subfossil remains. It likely disappeared as a result of the almost complete deforestation of the island, or introduced mammalian predators.

==== White-eyes (family Zosteropidae) ====
Common name	Scientific name	Range	Comments	Pictures
Marianne white-eye	Zosterops semiflavus	Marianne Island, Seychelles	Last collected in 1892. It was driven to extinction by deforestation to make way for coconut plantations, competition with introduced birds, and predation by black rats.	

==== Starlings (family Sturnidae) ====
Common name	Scientific name	Range	Comments	Pictures
Mauritius starling	Cryptopsar ischyrhynchus	Mauritius	Known from subfossil remains; it was never mentioned in early literature.	
Hoopoe starling	Fregilupus varius	Réunion	Last known individual killed in 1837. Possible reasons for extinction include hunting, habitat degradation, and introduced avian diseases.	
Rodrigues starling	Necropsar rodericanus	Rodrigues	Last recorded in 1726. The cause of extinction is unknown, but could have included hunting, habitat destruction, and predation by introduced mammals.	

==== Weavers (family Ploceidae) ====
Common name	Scientific name	Range	Comments	Pictures
Réunion fody	Foudia delloni	Réunion	Last recorded in 1671-1672. It could have disappeared due to predation by black rats, which were introduced a few years later, or the clearing of lowland forests for agriculture.	

== Reptiles (class Reptilia) ==
=== Crocodilians (order Crocodilia) ===
==== Crocodiles (family Crocodylidae) ====
Scientific name	Range	Comments	Pictures
Voay robustus	Madagascar	Most recent remains dated to 586-670 CE.	

===== Locally extinct =====
Common name	Scientific name	Range	Comments	Pictures
Saltwater crocodile	Crocodilus porosus	Indian Ocean and western Pacific coasts, from Seychelles to Southern China and Northern Australia	Exterminated from Seychelles by 1819.	

=== Squamates (order Squamata) ===
==== Common geckos (family Gekkonidae) ====
Common name	Scientific name	Range	Comments	Pictures
Rodrigues day gecko	Phelsuma edwardnewtonii	Rodrigues	Last collected in 1917. Probably driven to extinction due to predation by introduced rats or cats.	
Rodrigues giant day gecko	Phelsuma gigas	Rodrigues and nearby Frégate Island	Last collected in 1842. Disappeared from the main island after the introduction of cats in 1732-1755, and from Frégate after the introduction of brown rats.	

==== Skinks (family Scincidae) ====
Common name	Scientific name	Range	Comments	Pictures
	Gongylomorphus borbonicus	Réunion	Last recorded in 1839. Its extinction coincides with the introduction of the predatory oriental wolf snake in the island.	
Reunion giant skink	Leiolopisma ceciliae	Réunion	Only known from subfossil remains. It was possibly driven to extinction by rats, which were introduced in 1670.	
Mauritian giant skink	Leiolopisma mauritiana	Mauritius	Known from subfossil remains. The cause of extinction is unknown and may predate European arrival.	

==== Splitjaw snakes (family Bolyeriidae) ====
Common name	Scientific name	Range	Comments	Pictures
Round Island burrowing boa	Bolyeria multocarinata	Round Island and possibly mainland Mauritius	Possible subfossil vertebrae were found on mainland Mauritius but cannot be confidently assigned to this species or the extant Round Island boa (Casarea dussumieri). Similarly, snakes of the same size were reported on other offshore islands, such as Ile de la Passe on the southeast until the 1760s, Gunner's Quoin and Flat Island on the north until 1839. If present on mainland Mauritius, it might have been driven extinct there due to predation by rats or cats. Restricted with certainty to Round Island by 1881, it was last recorded in 1975. Its final extinction was caused by the island being denuded of vegetation by introduced goats and rabbits.	

==== Typical blind snakes (family Typhlopidae) ====
Common name	Scientific name	Range	Comments
Hoffstetter's worm snake	Madatyphlops cariei	Mauritius	Named after subfossil vertebrae found around 1900. A 1803 mention of a small snake could refer to this species.

=== Turtles and tortoises (order Testudines) ===
==== Typical sea turtles (family Cheloniidae) ====
===== Locally extinct =====
Common name	Scientific name	Range	Comments	Pictures
Green sea turtle	Chelonia mydas	Circumtropical	Extinct in the Mascarene Islands.	
Hawksbill sea turtle	Eretmochelys imbricata	Circumtropical	Extinct in the Mascarene Islands.	

==== Tortoises (family Testudinidae) ====
Common name	Scientific name	Range	Comments	Pictures
Abrupt giant tortoise	Aldabrachelys abrupta	Madagascar	Most recent remains dated to 1230-1315.	
Daudin's giant tortoise	Aldabrachelys gigantea daudinii	Mahé, Seychelles	Extinct since c. 1850.	
Grandidier's giant tortoise	Aldabrachelys grandidieri	Madagascar	Most recent remains dated to 668-884 CE.	
	Astrochelys rogerbouri	Madagascar	Discovered after genetic testing of a subfossil bone originally identified as a juvenile Aldabrachelys, dating to 688-881 CE.	
Réunion giant tortoise	Cylindraspis indica	Réunion	Extinct since c. 1840.	
Saddle-backed Mauritius giant tortoise	Cylindraspis inepta	Mauritius	Extinct, at least on the main island, since c. 1735. In 1844 a female tortoise was captured alive on Round Island and taken to Mauritius, where it laid eggs that hatched. The fate and species of these tortoises is unknown.	
Domed Rodrigues giant tortoise	Cylindraspis peltastes	Rodrigues	Extinct since c. 1800.	
Domed Mauritius giant tortoise	Cylindraspis triserrata	Mauritius	Extinct, at least on the main island, since c. 1735. In 1844 a female tortoise was captured alive on Round Island and taken to Mauritius, where it laid eggs that hatched. The fate and species of these tortoises is unknown.	
Saddle-backed Rodrigues giant tortoise	Cylindraspis vosmaeri	Rodrigues	Extinct since c. 1800.	

== Ray-finned fish (class Actinopterygii) ==
=== Cichlids and convict blennies (order Cichliformes) ===
==== Cichlids (family Cichlidae) ====
Scientific name	Range	Comments
Ptychochromis onilahy	Onilahy river, southwestern Madagascar	Known from five individuals collected in 1962, described as a new species in 2006. It was driven to extinction by deforestation causing increased sedimentation, along with fishing and predation by introduced tilapias.

=== Toothcarps (order Cyprinodontiformes) ===
==== Livebearers and relatives (family Poeciliidae) ====
Scientific name	Range	Comments
Pantanodon madagascariensis	Mahavelona to Fenoarivo, northeastern Madagascar	Disappeared in the 1960s due to conversion of its swamp habitat in rice fields, and competition with introduced gambusias.

== Insects (class Insecta) ==
=== Butterflies and moths (order Lepidoptera) ===
==== Brush-footed butterflies (family Nymphalidae) ====
Scientific name	Range	Comments	Pictures
Libythea cinyras	Mauritius	Last recorded in 1865.	

== Copepods (class Copepoda) ==
Note: (Note: Although some sources treat Copepoda as a subclass, the World Register of Marine Species considers Copepoda a class within the superclass Multicrustacea.)

=== Order Calanoida ===
==== Family Diaptomidae ====
Scientific name	Range
Tropodiaptomus ctenopus	Tananarive, Madagascar

=== Order Cyclopoida ===
==== Family Cyclopidae ====
Scientific name	Range	Comments	Pictures
Afrocyclops pauliani	Tananarive, Madagascar	Last collected in 1951.	

== Malacostracans (class Malacostraca) ==
=== Order Decapoda ===
==== Family Coenobitidae ====
===== Locally extinct =====
Common name	Scientific name	Range	Comments	Pictures
Coconut crab	Birgus latro	Tropical Indo-Pacific islands, excluding Mauritius.	Extinct in Madagascar, Rodrigues, and Réunion; extant in Seychelles and possibly Comoros.	

== Snails and slugs (class Gastropoda) ==
=== Order Stylommatophora ===
==== Family Cerastidae ====
Scientific name	Range	Comments	Pictures
Rachis comorensis	Mayotte		
Rachis sanguineus	Mauritius		
Pachnodus velutinus	Mahé, Seychelles	Hybridized with Pachnodus niger after it was introduced in 1972. By 1994 there were no pure individuals left.	

==== Family Euconulidae ====
Scientific name	Range	Comments
Caldwellia philyrina	Mauritius	
Colparion madgei	Mauritius	Last recorded in 1938.
Ctenoglypta newtoni	Mauritius	Last recorded in 1871.
Dupontia proletaria	Mauritius and Réunion	
Pachystyla rufozonata	Mauritius	Last recorded in 1869.

==== Family Helicarionidae ====
Scientific name	Range
Erepta nevilli	Mauritius
Harmogenanina linophora	Mauritius and Réunion
Harmogenanina subdetecta	Réunion

==== Family Streptaxidae ====
Scientific name	Range	Comments
Gibbus lyonetianus	Mauritius	Last seen in 1905.
Gonidomus newtoni	Mauritius	Last seen in 1867.
Gonospira nevilli	Mauritius	
Gulella mayottensis	Mayotte	

==== Family Cyclophoridae ====
Scientific name	Range	Pictures
Cyclophorus horridulum	Mayotte	
Cyclosurus mariei	Mayotte	

=== Order Littorinimorpha ===
==== Family Pomatiidae ====
Scientific name	Range	Pictures
Tropidophora desmazuresi	Mauritius	
Tropidophora semilineata	Mayotte	

== Bivalves (class Bivalvia) ==
=== Order Unionida ===
==== Family Unionidae ====
Scientific name	Range
Unio cariei	Réunion

== Plants (kingdom Plantae) ==
=== Gymnosperms (clade Gymnospermae) ===
==== Podocarps (family Podocarpaceae) ====
===== Possibly extinct =====
Scientific name	Range	Comments
Podocarpus perrieri	Eastern coast of Madagascar	Last collected in 1951. The known areas of collection are currently deforested.

=== Flowering plants (clade Angiospermae) ===
==== Palm trees (family Arecaceae) ====
===== Extinct in the wild =====
Common name	Scientific name	Range	Comments	Pictures
Loneliest palm	Hyophorbe amaricaulis	Mauritius	Reduced to a single individual at the Curepipe Botanical Garden. The tree cannot self-pollinate because male flowers open before the female. Clones produced in laboratory all died after being taken out of a sterile environment.	

===== Possibly extinct =====
Scientific name	Range	Comments
Dypsis brittiana	Tsaramain’Andro, Makira Natural Park, Madagascar	Only known from the holotype collected in 2005.

==== Sunflowers (family Asteraceae) ====
Scientific name	Range	Comments	Pictures
Cylindrocline lorencei	Mauritius	Extinct by 1990. Seeds and cuttings collected in the 1970s were used to regenerate plants artificially in 1993 in Brest, France, from where the species was reintroduced to Mauritius in 2024.	
Vernonia sechellensis	Mahé, Seychelles	Only known from the holotype collected in 1874. Most primary forest in the island was cleared in the 20th century.	

==== Ebony trees and persimmons (family Ebenaceae) ====
Scientific name	Range	Comments
Diospyros angulata	Mauritius	Last collected in 1851.

==== Euphorbias (family Euphorbiaceae) ====
===== Possibly extinct =====
Scientific name	Range	Comments
Euphorbia boinensis	Ankarafantsika and Mount Tsitondroina, Boeny, Madagascar	Last collected in 1920. Possibly extinct due to habitat degradation by fire.
Euphorbia pirahazo	Ambongo and Bemarivo, Madagascar	Recorded as "almost extinct" in 1921 due to overcollection for rubber.

==== Legumes (family Fabaceae) ====
===== Possibly extinct =====
Scientific name	Range	Comments
Delonix tomentosa	Ankara plateau, western Madagascar	Only known from the holotype collected in 1901. Its known habitat is threatened by fragmentation and slash and burn agriculture.
Mimosa kitrokala	Taolagnaro, southeastern Madagascar	Last recorded in 1947.

==== Laurels (family Lauraceae) ====
===== Possibly extinct =====
Scientific name	Range	Comments
Aspidostemon inconspicuus	Menagisy forest, Toamasina, Madagascar	Last recorded in 1955. Declined due to deforestation caused by slash-and-burn agriculture.

==== Orchids (family Orchidaceae) ====
Scientific name	Range	Comments
Oeceoclades seychellarum	Cascade Estate, Mahé, Seychelles	Only known from the holotype collected in 1902. Likely extinct due to habitat degradation caused by human settlement and invasive plants.

===== Possibly extinct =====
Scientific name	Range	Comments
Aeranthes albidiflora	Fianarantsoa, Madagascar	Only known from the holotype collected in 1959.
Angraecum mahavavense	Ambohipiraka, Antsiranana, Madagascar	Only known from the holotype collected in 1932.
Angraecum muscicolum	Tsinjoarivo, Bongolava, Madagascar	Only known from the holotype collected in 1925.
Angraecum perhumile	Tsinjoarivo, Bongolava, Madagascar	Only known from the holotype collected in 1925.
Angraecum potamophilum	Mahajanga, Madagascar	Only known from the holotype collected in 1898.
Angraecum rigidifolium	Mandraka, Antananarivo, Madagascar	Only known from the holotype collected in 1925.
Angraecum rubellum	Moramanga, Toamasina, Madagascar	Only known from the holotype collected in 1963.
Angraecum serpens	Toamasina, Madagascar	Only known from the holotype collected in 1942.
Angraecum sterrophyllum	Antananarivo, Madagascar	Only known from the holotype collected in 1913.
Benthamia nigro-vaginata	Fianarantsoa, Madagascar	Only known from the holotype collected in 1926.
Bulbophyllum erythroglossum	Toamasina, Madagascar	Last recorded in 1964.
Bulbophyllum hirsutiusculum	Fianarantsoa, Madagascar	Only known from the holotype collected in 1928.
Bulbophyllum minax	Fianarantsoa, Madagascar	Only known from the holotype collected in 1919.
Bulbophyllum sanguineum	Toamasina, Madagascar	Last recorded in 1925.
Bulbophyllum tampoketsense	Antananarivo, Madagascar	Last recorded in 1923. Possibly extinct due to overcollection and deforestation.
Cynorkis bimaculata	Manjakatompo, Antananarivo, Madagascar	Only known from the holotype collected in 1961.
Cynorkis catatii	Mandritsara, Mahajanga, Madagascar	Only known from the holotype collected in 1889.
Cynorkis rolfei	Vatomandry, Toamasina, Madagascar	Only known from the holotype collected in 1903.
Cynorkis sylvatica	Marivorahona, Antsiranana, Madagascar	Only known from the holotype collected in 1951.
Disperis bosseri	Ankaratra, Antananarivo, Madagascar	Only known from the holotype collected in 1957.
Eulophia grandidieri	Mahatsara, Toamasina, Madagascar	Only known from the holotype collected in 1901.

==== Coffee and relatives (family Rubiaceae) ====
===== Possibly extinct =====
Scientific name	Range	Comments
Hymenodictyon seyrigii	Toliara, Madagascar	Last collected in 1942. Possibly declined due to graphite mining and wildfires.

==== Willows (family Salicaceae) ====
Scientific name	Range
Casearia tinifolia	Mauritius

== See also ==
- List of African animals extinct in the Holocene
- List of European animals extinct in the Holocene
