= Hypogeomys australis =

Hypogeomys australis Temporal range: Holocene
- Left maxilla (upper jaw) from Andrahomana

Scientific classification
- Domain: Eukaryota
- Kingdom: Animalia
- Phylum: Chordata
- Class: Mammalia
- Order: Rodentia
- Family: Nesomyidae
- Genus: Hypogeomys
- Species: †H. australis

Binomial name
- †Hypogeomys australis G. Grandidier, 1903

Extinct rodent from Madagascar

Hypogeomys australis is an extinct rodent from central and southeastern Madagascar. First described in 1903, it is larger than its close relative, the living Hypogeomys antimena, which occurs further west, but otherwise similar. Average length of the femur (upper leg bone) is 72.1 mm, compared to 63.8 mm in H. antimena. One of the few extinct rodents of Madagascar, it survived to at least around 1536 BP based on radiocarbon dating. Little is known of its ecology, but it may have lived in burrows like its living relative and eaten some arid-adapted plants.

== Taxonomy ==
Hypogeomys australis was described in 1903 by Guillaume Grandidier from subfossil material collected in the cave of Andrahomana in southeastern Madagascar. The Hypogeomys material was similar to the living Hypogeomys antimena, but distinct enough for Grandidier to recognize it as a separate species, different in size and some morphological details. Grandidier described another subfossil Hypogeomys species in 1912, H. boulei, but the material that species was based on was later identified as the enigmatic mammal Plesiorycteropus. In 1946, Charles Lamberton illustrated another femur (upper leg bone) of H. australis; the origin and current whereabouts of this specimen are unknown. In 1996, Steven Goodman and Daniel Rakotondravony reviewed the distribution of Hypogeomys and confirmed that H. australis is a distinct species. H. australis and H. antimena are classified together within the exclusively Madagascan subfamily Nesomyinae of the family Nesomyidae, which includes various African rodents.

== Description ==
Right mandible (lower jaw) from Andrahomana, seen lingually (from the inside; at top) and occlusally (from above; at bottom)

Hypogeomys australis was generally similar to H. antimena, the largest living rodent of Madagascar, but even larger, with little if any overlap in measurements. Grandidier described the extinct species as more robust, with more prominent muscle scars on the long bones and with longer molars with more distinct crests and lobes. The length of the first lower molar is 5.2 to 6.4 mm, averaging 5.7 mm, in ten H. australis and 3.9 to 5.5 mm, averaging 4.8 mm, in twenty-four H. antimena. The width of the femur at the proximal (near) end is 18.6 to 21.5 mm, averaging 19.9 mm, in thirteen H. australis and 16.8 to 18.5 mm, averaging 17.5 mm, in nine H. antimena. In ten H. australis, total length of the femur is 69.9 to 75.1 mm, averaging 72.1 mm, compared to 59.7 to 69.9 mm, averaging 63.8 mm in nine H. antimena.

== Distribution and ecology ==
Remains attributed to Hypogeomys australis are known from Andrahomana in southeastern Madagascar and Antsirabe in central Madagascar, suggesting a broad former distribution. Its range is not known to overlap that of H. antimena, which has undergone a dramatic reduction during the Holocene. A bone from Andrahomana has been radiocarbon dated to about 4440 BP and another to 1536 BP. Although almost nothing is known of the ecology of H. australis, Goodman and Rakotondravony presumed that it was similar to its living relative in living in burrows in areas with loose soils. H. australis shows relatively high content of carbon-13 isotope, likely because it ate some plants which were enriched in carbon-13 through C_{4} carbon fixation and crassulacean acid metabolism; both of these photosynthesis-related processes occur most frequently in plants adapted to dry environments.

Hypogeomys australis is one of only three extinct rodents known from Madagascar (the others are Brachytarsomys mahajambaensis and Nesomys narindaensis from northwestern Madagascar). In general, few small animals became extinct on Madagascar, except for these rodents, two species of Plesiorycteropus, and the shrew tenrec Microgale macpheei; in contrast, large animals such as subfossil lemurs, the carnivore Cryptoprocta spelea, Malagasy hippopotamuses, Dipsochelys tortoises, and Aepyornis and Mullerornis birds all became extinct around the time that humans arrived.

== Literature cited ==
- Burney, D.A., Burney, L.P., Godfrey, L.R., Jungers, W.L., Goodman, S.M., Wright, H.T. and Jull, A.J.T. 2004. A chronology for late prehistoric Madagascar (subscription required). Journal of Human Evolution 47:25–63.
- Crowley, B.E., Godfrey, L.R. and Irwin, M.T. 2010. A glance to the past: subfossils, stable isotopes, seed dispersal, and lemur species loss in Southern Madagascar (subscription required). American Journal of Primatology 71:1–13.
- Goodman, S.M. and Rakotondravony, D. 1996. The Holocene distribution of Hypogeomys (Rodentia: Muridae: Nesomyinae) on Madagascar. Biogéographie de Madagascar 1996:283–293.
- Grandidier, G. 1903. Description de l'Hypogeomys australis, nouvelle espèce de Rongeur sub-fossile de Madagascar. Bulletin du Muséum national d'histoire naturelle 9:13–15 (in French).
- MacPhee, R.D.E. 1994. Morphology, adaptations, and relationships of Plesiorycteropus, and a diagnosis of a new order of eutherian mammals. Bulletin of the American Museum of Natural History 220:1–214.
- Mein, P., Sénégas, F., Gommery, D., Ramanivoso, B., Randrianantenaina, H. and Kerloc'h, P. 2010. Nouvelles espèces subfossiles de rongeurs du Nord-Ouest de Madagascar (subscription required). Comptes Rendus Palevol 9(3):101–112 (in French, with abridged English version).
- Musser, G.G. and Carleton, M.D. 2005. Superfamily Muroidea. Pp. 894–1531 in Wilson, D.E. and Reeder, D.M. (eds.). Mammal Species of the World: a taxonomic and geographic reference. 3rd ed. Baltimore: The Johns Hopkins University Press, 2 vols., 2142 pp. ISBN 978-0-8018-8221-0
- Sommer, S. 1996. Ecology and social structure of Hypogeomys antimena, an endemic rodent of the dry deciduous forest in western Madagascar. Biogéographie de Madagascar 1996:295–302.
- Turvey, S.T. 2009. Holocene Extinctions. Oxford University Press US, 359 pp. ISBN 978-0-19-953509-5
