= Microgale macpheei =

Microgale macpheei Temporal range: Holocene

Conservation status
- Extinct

Scientific classification
- Kingdom: Animalia
- Phylum: Chordata
- Class: Mammalia
- Order: Afrosoricida
- Suborder: Tenrecomorpha
- Family: Tenrecidae
- Genus: Microgale
- Species: †M. macpheei

Binomial name
- †Microgale macpheei Goodman, Vasey, and Burney, 2007
- Location of Andrahomana Cave, the only place where Microgale macpheei has been found

Extinct shrew tenrec from Madagascar

Microgale macpheei is an extinct shrew tenrec from southeastern Madagascar. It is known only from two partial skulls found in Andrahomana cave, which radiocarbon dating of associated rodent remains suggests are about 3000 years old. It is the only known recently extinct tenrec. First described in 2007, it is most similar to the smaller Microgale brevicaudata of northern and western Madagascar. M. macpheei has a broad rostrum (front part of the skull) and, like M. brevicaudata, lacks a diastema (gap) between the premolars. A number of details of tooth morphology are characteristic of M. macpheei.

== Taxonomy ==
Remains of shrew tenrecs (Microgale) were found during expeditions to the cave of Andrahomana in southeastern Madagascar, led by David Burney in 2000 and 2003. The Microgale material was described as a new species, M. macpheei, in 2007 by Steven Goodman, Natalie Vasey, and Burney. The species was named after Ross MacPhee in honor of his contributions to knowledge of the genus Microgale and the paleontology of Madagascar. Goodman and colleagues considered the living Microgale brevicaudata from northern and western Madagascar to be the closest relative of M. macpheei; some populations of this tenrec have since been separated into a different species, M. grandidieri. The common name "MacPhee's shrew tenrec" has been proposed for M. macpheei. The genus of M. macpheei, Microgale, includes more than 20 species and is the largest of the tenrec family, which includes a variety of other Malagasy mammals.

== Description ==
Microgale macpheei is known from two specimens: a damaged cranium (skull without mandibles, or lower jaws) lacking the back part (the parietal bones and further back) as well as the incisors, canines, and second premolars; (Note: The dental formula in Microgale is 3.1.3.33.1.3.3 (three incisors, one canine, three premolars, and three molars in both the upper and lower dentition). The three premolars are numbered 2, 3, and 4, as the first premolar is presumed to have been lost.) and another damaged cranium lacking the same parts as well as the left toothrow. Both show no evidence of ongoing tooth replacement, indicating that the permanent dentition is complete. M. macpheei was larger in most measurements than M. brevicaudata, (Note: This description is based on Goodman et al. (2007), published before M. grandidieri and M. brevicaudata were described as distinct species. Much of the material of "M. brevicaudata" used in the 2007 paper is in fact M. grandidieri.) but because of small samples, some differences are not statistically significant. The length of the bony palate in the two specimens of M. macpheei is 9.4 and 9.7 mm, compared to 7.1 to 9.0 mm in eight adult M. brevicaudata. In both specimens, the length of the molar row is 3.0 mm, compared to 2.4 to 2.8 mm in the sample of M. brevicaudata.

The rostrum (front part of the skull) is short and blunt in both M. macpheei and M. brevicaudata, contrasting with the condition in other Microgale, but the rostrum of M. brevicaudata is distinctly more tapered at the front, whereas that of M. macpheei is more blunt at the front. Unlike other Microgale, M. brevicaudata and M. macpheei lack gaps (diastemata) between the premolars. M. macpheei had larger, more robust teeth than M. brevicaudata. In both species, the mesiostyle and distostyle, two crests, on the fourth premolar (P4) and the molars are reduced relative to the condition in other Microgale. M. macpheei lacks an extension of the protocone cusp on the lingual (inner) side of the third upper premolar (P3) and P4, present in M. brevicaudata, and has the paracone cusp on P4 less well-developed. On the other hand, the front part of the ectostyle crest on P4 is larger. The relative lengths of some of the crests on the two last molars (Note: Goodman et al. (2007) are inconsistent in identifying the three molars as M1 through M3 or M2 through M4; the former convention is used in MacPhee's 1987 revision of the genus.) also differ between the two species.

== Distribution and ecology ==
Microgale macpheei is known only from the cave of Andrahomana. Its past presence there, like that of the extinct rodent Hypogeomys australis, suggests formerly more mesic (wet) conditions around the cave, which is currently in a dry area. In addition to M. macpheei, three other tenrecs have been described from subfossil material, but none are currently recognized as valid species; thus, M. macpheei is at present the only known recently extinct tenrec species. However, there is a remnant patch of mesic forest near Andrahomana, where a population of M. macpheei may survive. Although no radiocarbon dating has been carried out on M. macpheei remains, bones of the rodent Macrotarsomys petteri from layers in the same cave deposit bracketing those where M. macpheei was found yield dates of around 2480 and 1760 Before Present.

== Literature cited ==
- Goodman, S.M., Vasey, N. and Burney, D.A. 2007. "Description of a new species of subfossil shrew tenrec (Afrosoricida: Tenrecidae: Microgale) from cave deposits in southeastern Madagascar" (subscription required). Proceedings of the Biological Society of Washington 120:367–376.
- MacPhee, R.D.E. 1987. "The shrew tenrecs of Madagascar: systematic revision and Holocene distribution of Microgale (Tenrecidae, Insectivora)". American Museum Novitates 2889:1–45.
- Muldoon, K.M., de Blieux, D.D., Simons, E.L. and Chatrath, P.S. 2009. "The subfossil occurrence and paleoecological significance of small mammals at Ankilitelo Cave, southwestern Madagascar" (subscription required). Journal of Mammalogy 90(5):1111–1131.
- Olson, L.E., Rakotomalala, Z., Hildebrandt, K.B.P., Lanier, H.C., Raxworthy, C.J. and Goodman, S.M. 2009. "Phylogeography of Microgale brevicaudata (Tenrecidae) and description of a new species from western Madagascar" (subscription required). Journal of Mammalogy 90(5):1095–1110.
