= Lowland red forest rat =

There are two species named Lowland red forest rat.

- Western nesomys
- White-bellied nesomys
