= Andranombory =

- Location in Madagascar
- Coordinates: 25°7′S 46°31′E
- Country: Madagascar
- Region: Anosy
- District: Taolanaro
- Elevation: 22 m (72 ft)

Population (2001)
  - Total: 5,000
- Time zone: UTC3 (EAT)
- Postal code: 614

Andranombory or Andranobory is a rural municipality in Madagascar. It belongs to the district of Taolanaro, which is a part of Anosy Region. The population of the commune was estimated to be approximately 5,000 in 2001 commune census.

Only primary schooling is available. Farming and raising livestock provides employment for 40% and 10% of the working population. The most important crops are maize and tobacco, while other important agricultural products are cassava and sweet potatoes. Industry and services provide both employment for 6% of the population. Additionally fishing employs 38% of the population.

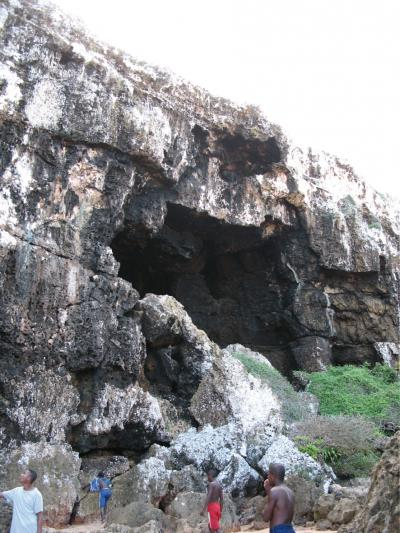
Cave Grotte d'Andrahomana

== Megafauna ==
In the Andrahomana Cave were found fossils of giant lemur Hadropithecus stenognathus, pygmy hippo Hippopotamus lemerlei and the giant land tortoise Aldabrachelys grandidieri.
