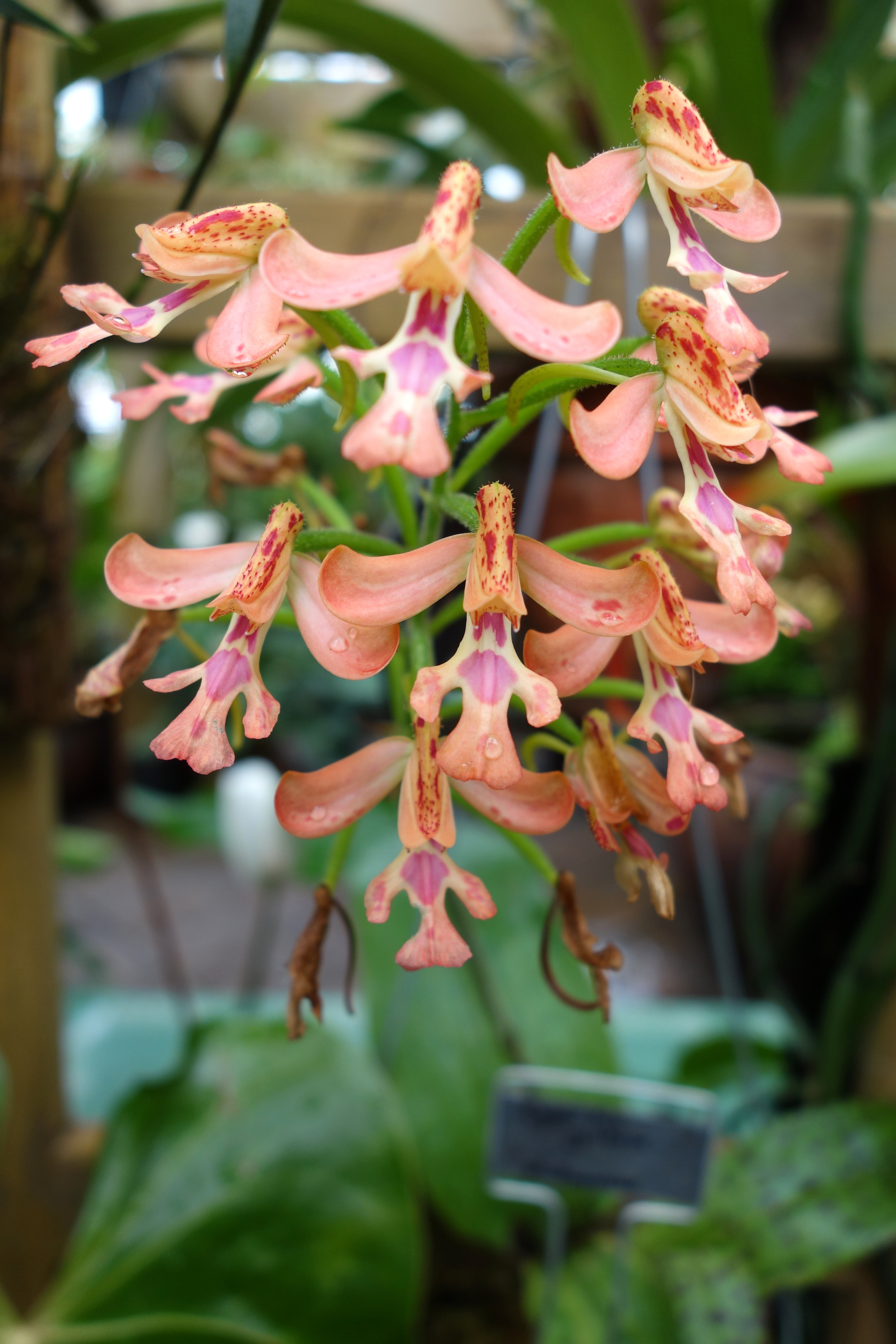
- Cultivated specimen of C. gibbosa in bloom at the Conservatory of Flowers

Conservation status
- Least Concern (IUCN 3.1)
- CITES Appendix II

Scientific classification
- Kingdom: Plantae
- Clade: Tracheophytes
- Clade: Angiosperms
- Clade: Monocots
- Order: Asparagales
- Family: Orchidaceae
- Subfamily: Orchidoideae
- Genus: Cynorkis
- Species: C. gibbosa

Binomial name
- Cynorkis gibbosa Ridl.

= Cynorkis gibbosa =

Species of orchid

Cynorkis gibbosa is a species of orchid endemic to Madagascar. It may grow as a lithophyte or as a terrestrial plant, and is sometimes cultivated as an ornamental plant.

== Distribution and habitat ==
Wild Cynorkis gibbosa can be found in the regions of Madagascar formerly known as Antananarivo Province, Antsiranana Province, Fianarantsoa Province, Toamasina Province, and Toliara Province. It inhabits the edges of humid, subhumid, and montane forests at elevations of 500–2,499 m (1,640–8,199 ft) above sea level, as a lithophyte growing on damp rocks or as a terrestrial plant growing in peaty or humus-rich soil. It can be found in shaded positions or in more open (but still sheltered) places such as rocky outcrops, cliffs, and roadsides.

Several wild populations of this species fall within the boundaries of Andringitra National Park, Andohahela National Park, and Pic d'Ivohibe Reserve.

== Description ==
Cynorkis gibbosa is a herbaceous plant arising from a cluster of elongate tubers. Typically, only a single leaf is present at the base of the stem, though sometimes a second, smaller leaf will also develop. The shape of the leaf is usually elliptic or ovate, sometimes elongate or even strap-like, with a blunt tip. Leaves are hairless, measuring 10–30 cm (3.9–11.8 in) long and 3–8 cm (1.2–3.1 in) wide, deep green in colour with black or purplish spots that often fade with age. The inflorescence is bright green, sometimes spotted, and densely covered with glandular hairs. It arises from the base of the leaf, growing 25–50 cm (9.8–19.7 in) tall with 2 or 3 spotted bracts. The inflorescence bears between 10 and 40 densely packed flowers. The flowers are mostly coral or salmon pink in colour, each measuring roughly 2.5 cm (0.98 in) in diameter and borne on a 2–3 cm (0.79–1.18 in) long pedicel. The petals are long and narrow, somewhat curved at the tip, measuring 12–13 mm (0.47–0.51 in) long and 2.5–3 mm (0.098–0.118 in) wide. The dorsal sepal is 13–15 mm (0.51–0.59 in) long, marked with darker red spots and tinted green towards the base of the flower. The lateral sepals measure 14–17 mm (0.55–0.67 in) long and 5–6 mm (0.20–0.24 in) wide and are curved upwards at the tip. The labellum is white towards the base of the flower with a mauve blotch at the center and measures 20–25 mm (0.79–0.98 in) long with a three-lobed tip. The large central lobe may be broad and notched or even bilobed. The column is 12–14 mm (0.47–0.55 in) long and covered by the concave petals and dorsal sepal, which come together to form a hood. The spur is bright green and slender, measuring 23–27 mm (0.91–1.06 in) long.

Wild plants are dormant from April to October, with new growth appearing in November. Flowering occurs primarily in January and February, but may continue into March.

== Cultivation ==
Cynorkis gibbosa is somewhat uncommon in orchid collections. Plants in cultivation tend to appear different from their wild counterparts, with paler flowers and leaves often losing their darker spots.

In cultivation, this species appreciates bright and warm conditions, no lower than 20 °C (68 °F) in winter and no higher than 35 °C (95 °F) in summer. To prevent rot, plants should be provided with well-drained substrate and kept in a ventilated area with ample air flow. Substrate should be replaced every two or three years, just before active growth begins. The plant should not be watered directly after it finishes flowering and begins to die back.
