= Nesomys narindaensis =

Nesomys narindaensis Temporal range: Late Pleistocene – Holocene

Scientific classification
- Kingdom: Animalia
- Phylum: Chordata
- Class: Mammalia
- Order: Rodentia
- Family: Nesomyidae
- Genus: Nesomys
- Species: N. narindaensis

Binomial name
- Nesomys narindaensis Mein et al., 2010

Extinct species of rodent

Nesomys narindaensis is an extinct rodent that lived in northwestern Madagascar. It is known from subfossil skull bones and isolated molars found in several sites during field work that started in 2001. First described in 2010, it is placed in the genus Nesomys together with three smaller living species, which may differ in some details of molar morphology. The presence of N. narindaensis, a rare element in the local rodent fauna, suggests that the region was previously more humid.

== Taxonomy ==
Remains of Nesomys narindaensis were found during fieldwork in northwestern Madagascar that started in 2001. The species was described in a 2010 paper by Pierre Mein and colleagues, together with another extinct rodent, Brachytarsomys mahajambaensis. The specific name, narindaensis, where one of the sites where the species has been found is located. It is placed in the genus Nesomys, together with three smaller living species, N. audeberti, N. lambertoni, and N. rufus. Nesomys is classified in the exclusively Madagascan subfamily Nesomyinae of the family Nesomyidae, which includes various African rodents.

== Description ==
Nesomys narindaensis is known from a damaged skull, missing part of the back, a mandible (lower jaw) with the first two molars (m1 and m2), and four isolated molars (one first upper molar, M1, one third upper molar, M3, and two m2). It is larger than each of the three living species, and the known material additionally differs from those in a few details that may not hold in larger samples. Total skull length is 61.3 mm, longer than in the largest living species, N. lambertoni (50.3–53.8 mm). The width of the palate between the M1 is 8.7 mm (7.2–7.9 mm in N. lambertoni) and the length of the upper toothrow is 9.04 and 9.16 mm on the two sides of the skull (7.2–7.9 mm in N. lambertoni).

M1 is flat-crowned. The anteroloph, a crest at the front of the tooth, lacks a smaller accessory spur that is present in N. rufus. The paracone, one of the main cusps, is quite small; this cusp is more prominent in N. rufus. The mesoloph, a crest on the middle of the tooth, is distinct but short and located further to the back than in N. rufus. M2 has a longer mesoloph. M3 is largely flat-crowned, but the paracone is a bit more prominent than the rest. The valley between the cusps at the front is deeper than the valleys at the back. Each of the upper molars has three roots.

The m1 is long and narrow. The anteroconid, the cusp at the front of the tooth, is oriented perpendicularly to the main axis of the tooth and on the lingual (inner) side is separated from the metaconid cusp. The protoconid, another cusp on the labial (outer) side, is connected at its back to a longitudinal crest, which in turn anchors the transverse mesolophid crest, and then joins the hypoconid labial cusp. In front of the hypoconid, an ectostylid (a smaller cuspule) is present. The entoconid cusp, located lingually, is relatively high and is separated from the mesolophid before it by a deep valley. Another crest, the posterolophid, is present behind the hypoconid. At the front of the m2, crests known as the anterolophid and anterolabial cingulum are present before the protoconid and the metaconid. As on the m1, a transverse mesolophid and an ectostylid are present. The hypoconid and the entoconid are present, as is the posterolophid behind them. Within the posterolophid, there is a small valley that is absent in N. rufus. Both m1 and m2 have two roots; m3 is unknown.

== Distribution and ecology ==
Remains of Nesomys narindaensis have been found at the sites of Antsingiavo, Ambongonambakoa, and Ambatomainty in northwestern Madagascar, which are latest Pleistocene (126,000 to 10,000 years ago) and early Holocene (less than 10,000 years ago) in age. Nesomys is a rare element of the rodent fauna, which is dominated by multiple species of Eliurus and Macrotarsomys. Modern Nesomys live on the ground in eastern (N. audeberti and N. rufus) and western (N. lambertoni) Madagascar. The only surviving western species, N. lambertoni, is restricted to a relict humid karst area; the presence of N. narindaensis and Brachyuromys mahajambaensis suggests that the past environment in northwestern Madagascar was also more humid. Subfossil remains of Nesomys have been recorded from some other localities in northwestern Madagascar, but these have not been described.

== Literature cited ==
- Mein, P., Sénégas, F., Gommery, D., Ramanivoso, B., Randrianantenaina, H. and Kerloc'h, P. 2010. Nouvelles espèces subfossiles de rongeurs du Nord-Ouest de Madagascar (subscription required). Comptes Rendus Palevol 9(3):101–112 (in French, with abridged English version).
- Musser, G.G. and Carleton, M.D. 2005. Superfamily Muroidea. Pp. 894–1531 in Wilson, D.E. and Reeder, D.M. (eds.). Mammal Species of the World: a taxonomic and geographic reference. 3rd ed. Baltimore: The Johns Hopkins University Press, 2 vols., 2142 pp. ISBN 978-0-8018-8221-0
