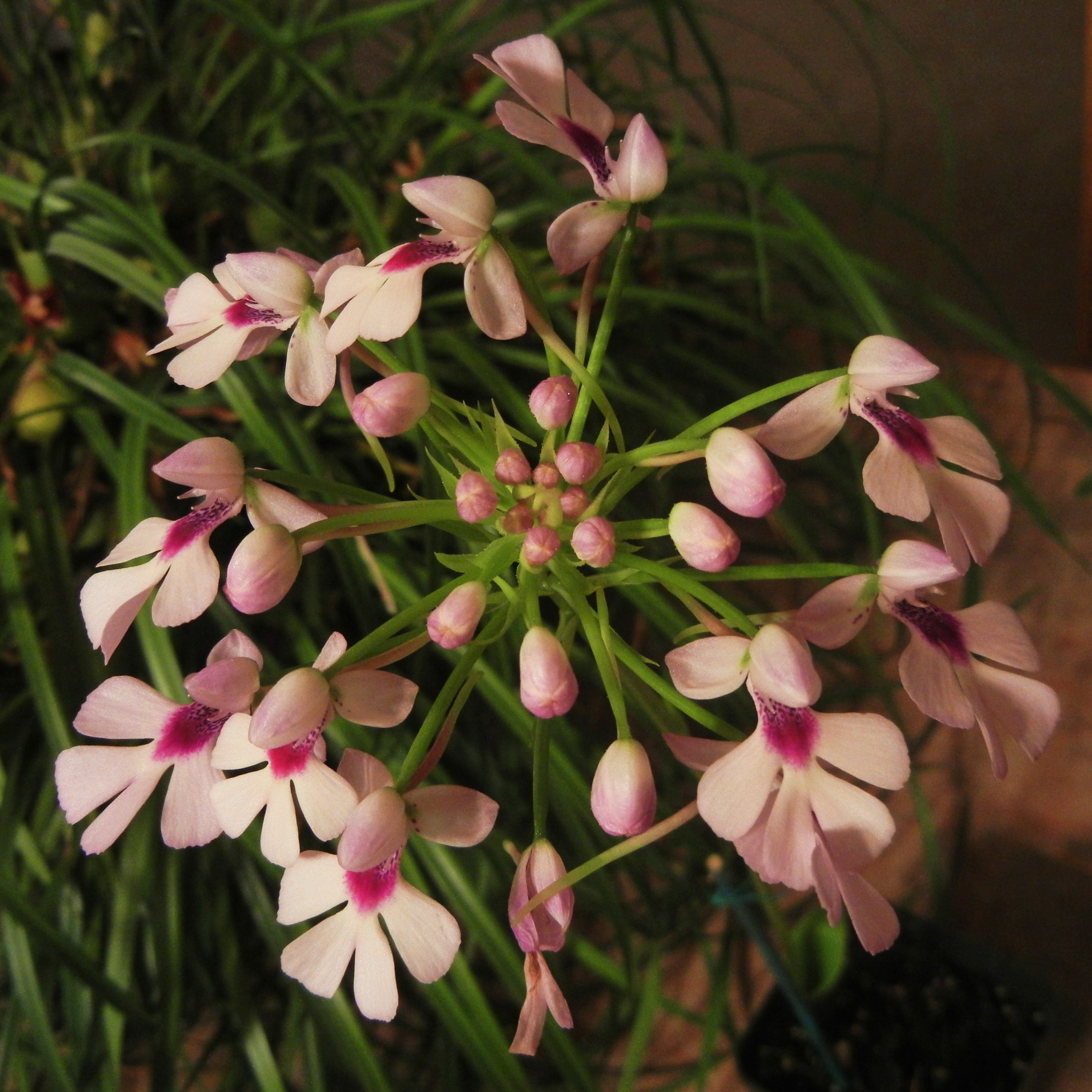

Scientific classification
- Kingdom: Plantae
- Clade: Embryophytes
- Clade: Tracheophytes
- Clade: Spermatophytes
- Clade: Angiosperms
- Clade: Monocots
- Order: Asparagales
- Family: Orchidaceae
- Subfamily: Orchidoideae
- Genus: Cynorkis
- Species: C. angustipetala

Binomial name
- Cynorkis angustipetala Ridl. (1885)

= Cynorkis angustipetala =

Species of orchid

Cynorkis angustipetala is an orchid species in the genus Cynorkis found in Madagascar.

== Taxonomy and nomenclature ==
Cynorkis angustipetala was originally described in 1885. However, the name has been applied incorrectly to another species, which is now known as C. speciosa. In 2007, Hermans and Cribb realized that two distinct species were distributed as C. uncinata, which is a synonym of C. calanthoides, and described a new species C. guttata. Subsequently, Hermans and Cribb (2014) realized that C. guttata actually corresponds to what Ridley described as C. angustipetala, and what we have been calling C. angustipetala is C. speciosa. They speculated that this confusion was originated from the type specimen folder of C. anugustipetala, which contained a herbarium sheet that had both C. angustipetala and C. speciosa in a single sheet as well as another sheet that had C. speciosa. Subsequent researchers looked at the type specimen folder, and they mistakenly thought that the name C. angustipetala referred to the green sepal species, which is actually C. speciosa.

== Description ==
Cynorkis angustipetala is also endemic to Madagascar, and its habitat is terrestrial in rocky outcrops and grassland. It is fairly common in the highlands of Madagascar and has sporadic distribution in the east and west of the island. In Tropicos, there are two records of specimens from Antsiranana at the elevation of 225 m (738 ft) and 315 m (1,033 ft). Global Biodiversity Information Facility (GBIF) lists three additional records, which include western populations.
