= List of non-marine molluscs of Mayotte =

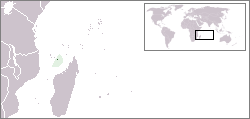
Location of Mayotte

The non-marine molluscs of Mayotte are a part of the molluscan fauna of Mayotte.

== Land gastropods ==
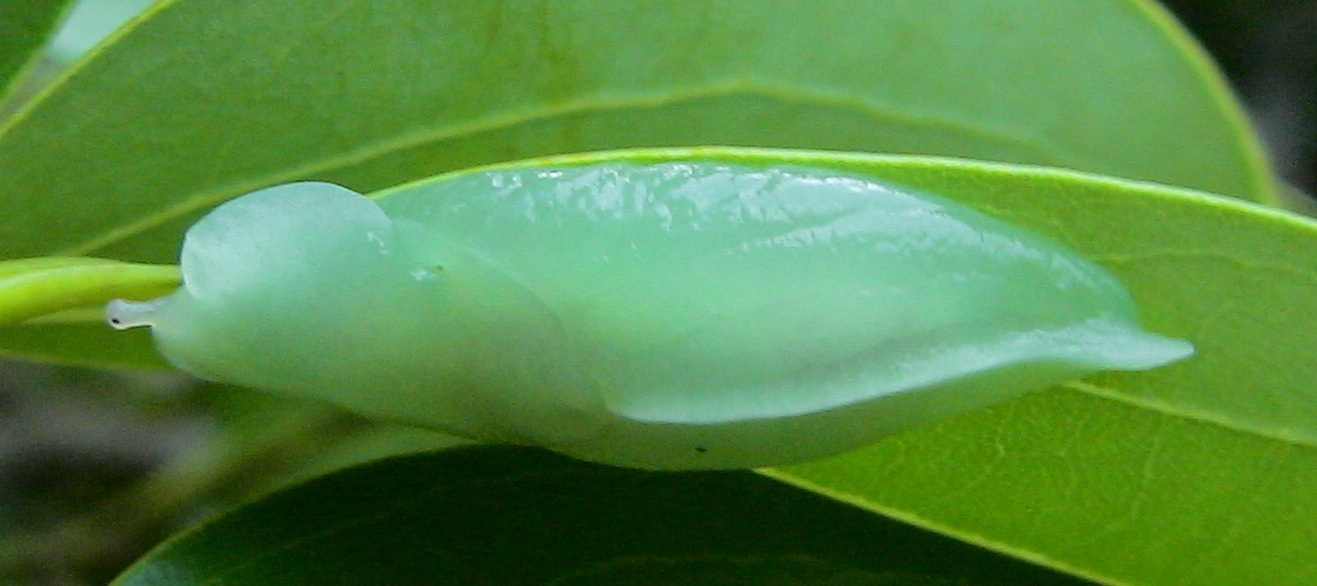
An unidentified land slug from Mayotte.

Pomatiidae

- Tropidophora semilineata - extinct

Cyclophoridae

- Cyclophorus horridulum - extinct
- Cyclosurus mariei Morelet, 1881 - extinct

Cerastidae

- Rhachis comorensis - extinct

Streptaxidae

- Gulella mayottensis - extinct
- Pseudelma Kobelt, 1904

== See also ==
- List of marine molluscs of Mayotte
- List of non-marine molluscs of Mauritius
- List of non-marine molluscs of the Seychelles
- List of non-marine molluscs of Madagascar
