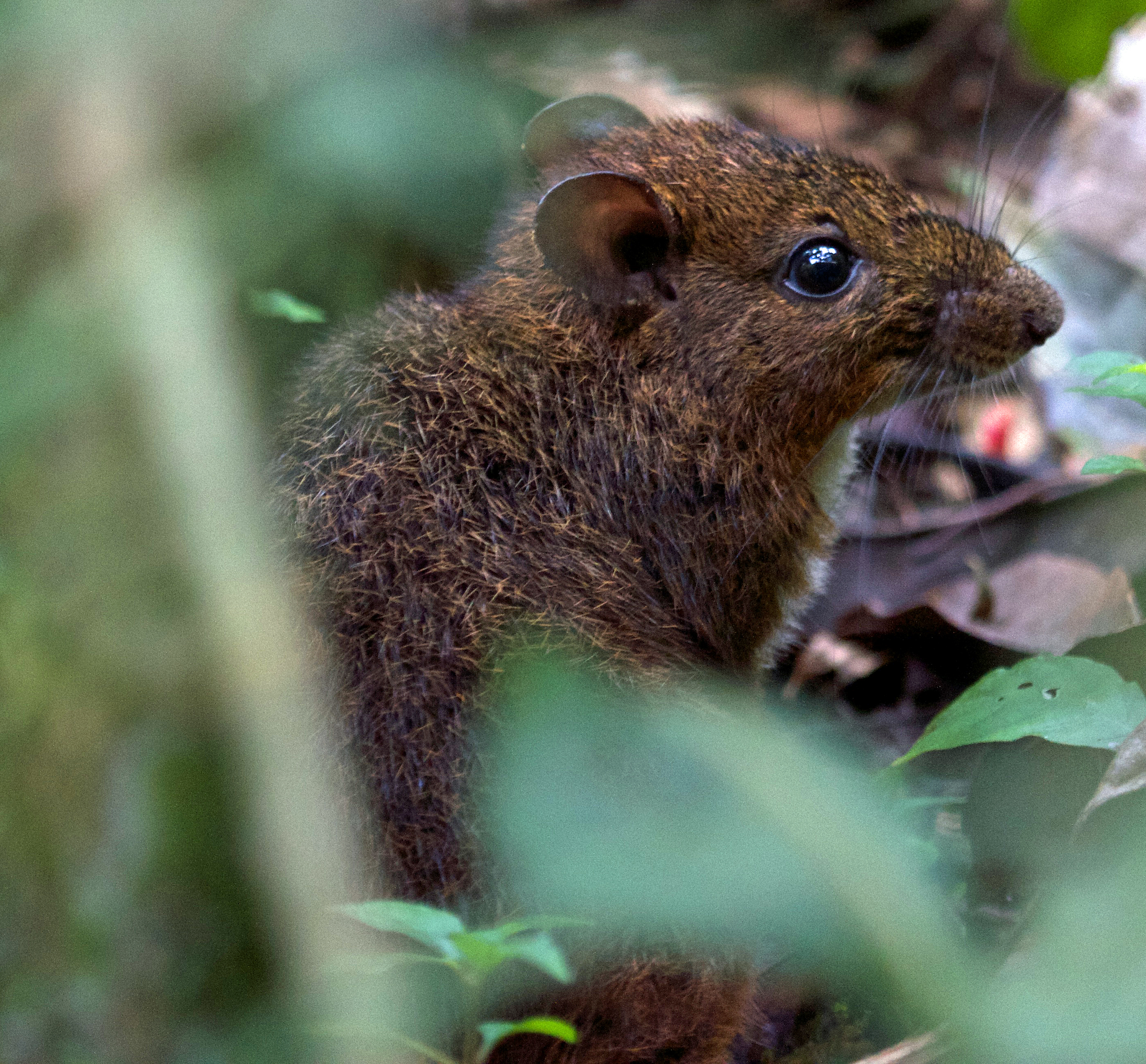
- Nesomys rufus

Scientific classification
- Domain: Eukaryota
- Kingdom: Animalia
- Phylum: Chordata
- Class: Mammalia
- Order: Rodentia
- Family: Nesomyidae
- Subfamily: Nesomyinae
- Genus: Nesomys; Peters, 1870

Type species
- Nesomys rufus

Species
- See text.

= Nesomys =

Nesomys Temporal range: Pleistocene to Recent

Genus of rodents

Nesomys, also called red forest rats, is a genus of rodent in the family Nesomyidae. It is found only on Madagascar, and contains the following species:

- White-bellied nesomys (Nesomys audeberti)
- Western nesomys (Nesomys lambertoni)
- Nesomys narindaensis †
- Island mouse (Nesomys rufus)
