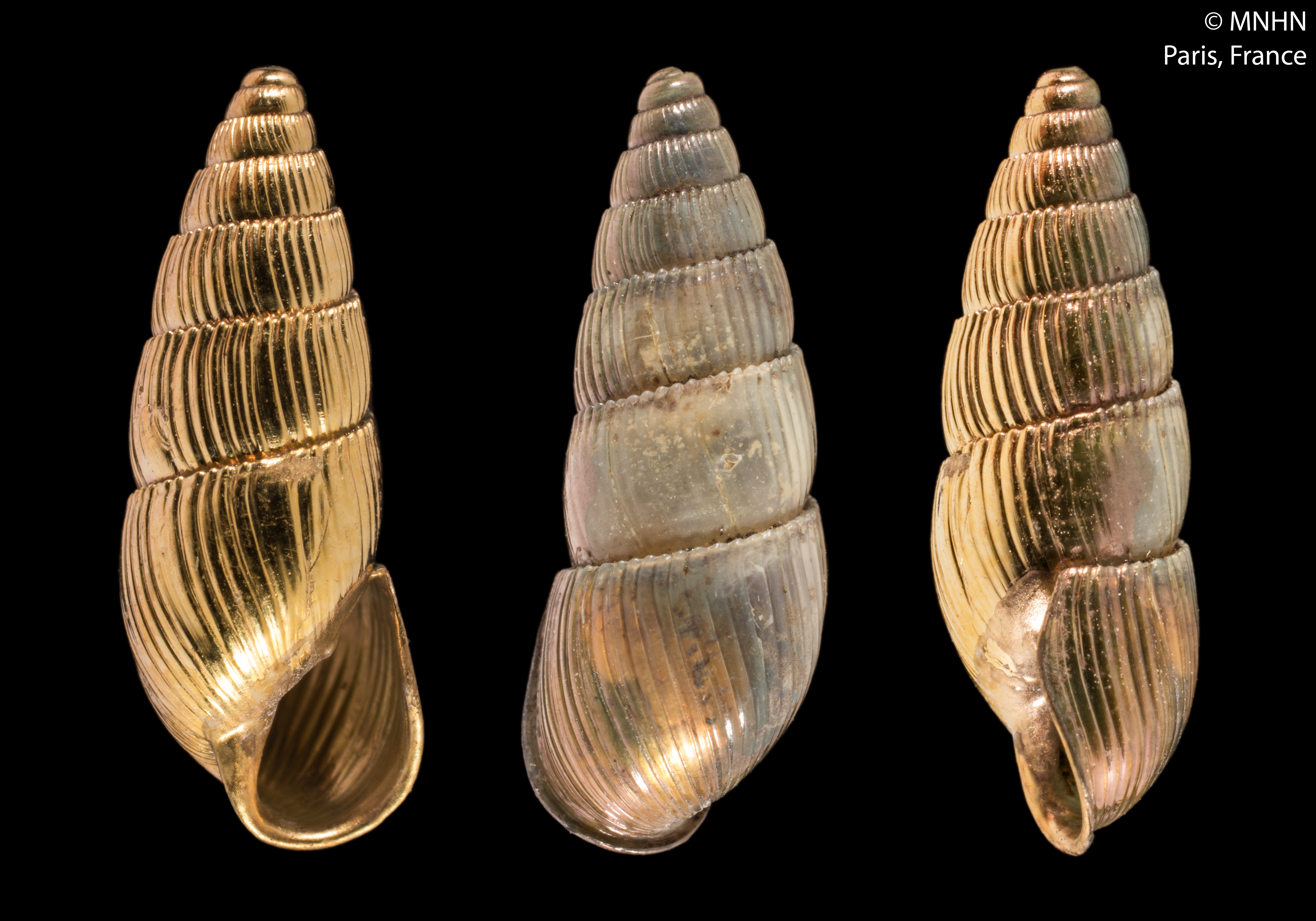
- Shell of Pseudelma auribole (holotype at MNHN, Paris)

Scientific classification
- Kingdom: Animalia
- Phylum: Mollusca
- Class: Gastropoda
- Order: Stylommatophora
- Suborder: Achatinina
- Superfamily: Streptaxoidea
- Family: Streptaxidae
- Genus: Pseudelma; Kobelt, 1904

Type species
- Ennea incisa Morelet, 1881

Synonyms
- Elma (Fultonelma) F. Haas, 1951; Ennea (Pseudelma) Kobelt, 1904 (original rank); Pseudelma (Fultonelma) F. Haas, 1951· accepted, alternate representation; Pseudelma (Marielma) Abdou, Muratov & Bouchet, 2008· accepted, alternate representation; Pseudelma (Pseudelma) Kobelt, 1904· accepted, alternate representation

= Pseudelma =

Genus of gastropods

Pseudelma is a genus of air-breathing land snails, terrestrial pulmonate gastropod mollusks in the subfamily Gulellinae of the family Streptaxidae.

== Distribution ==
The distribution of the genus Pseudelma includes:

- Mayotte
- Comores

== Species ==
Species within the genus Pseudelma include:

- Pseudelma auribole Abdou, Muratov & Bouchet, 2008
- Pseudelma auriculata (Morelet, 1881)
- Pseudelma aurititi Abdou, Muratov & Bouchet, 2008
- Pseudelma bisexigua (F. Haas, 1951)
- Pseudelma incisa (Morelet, 1881)
- Pseudelma inconspicua (Morelet, 1881)
- Pseudelma martensiana (Morelet, 1881)

Species brought into synonymy

- Pseudelma madagascariensis Fischer-Piette, F. Blanc & Vukadinovic, 1974: synonym of Elma messageri (Bavay & Dautzenberg, 1904)
