= Cyclophorus horridulum =

Conservation status
- Extinct (IUCN 2.3)

Scientific classification
- Kingdom: Animalia
- Phylum: Mollusca
- Class: Gastropoda
- Subclass: Caenogastropoda
- Order: Architaenioglossa
- Family: Cyclophoridae
- Genus: Cyclophorus
- Species: †C. horridulum

Binomial name
- †Cyclophorus horridulum (Morelet, 1882)

Species of gastropod

†Cyclophorus horridulum is an extinct species of small, air-breathing, land snails with an operculum, terrestrial pulmonate gastropod molluscs in the family Cyclophoridae. This species was endemic to Mayotte.
