= Short-tailed shrew tenrec =

Short-tailed Shrew Tenrec

Conservation status
- Least Concern (IUCN 3.1)

Scientific classification
- Kingdom: Animalia
- Phylum: Chordata
- Class: Mammalia
- Order: Afrosoricida
- Suborder: Tenrecomorpha
- Family: Tenrecidae
- Genus: Microgale
- Species: M. brevicaudata

Binomial name
- Microgale brevicaudata G. Grandidier, 1899
- Short-tailed Shrew Tenrec range

Species of mammal

The short-tailed shrew tenrec (Microgale brevicaudata) is a species of mammal in the family Tenrecidae. It is endemic to Madagascar. Its natural habitats are subtropical and tropical dry and moist lowland forests.
