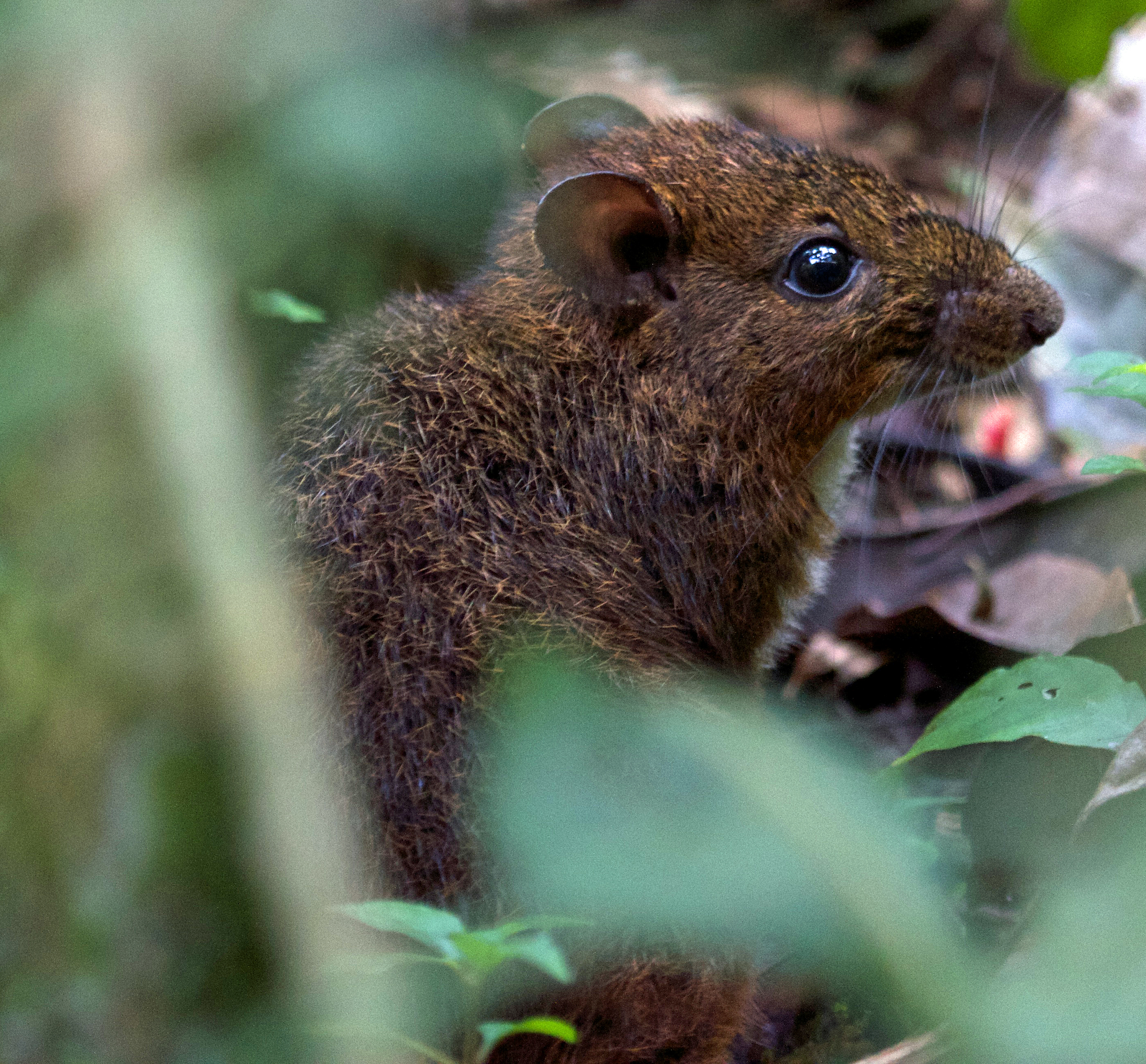

Conservation status
- Least Concern (IUCN 3.1)

Scientific classification
- Kingdom: Animalia
- Phylum: Chordata
- Class: Mammalia
- Order: Rodentia
- Family: Nesomyidae
- Genus: Nesomys
- Species: N. rufus

Binomial name
- Nesomys rufus Peters, 1870
- Island mouse range

= Island mouse =

Species of rodent

The island mouse or eastern red forest rat (Nesomys rufus) is a species of rodent in the family Nesomyidae. It is endemic to Madagascar.
