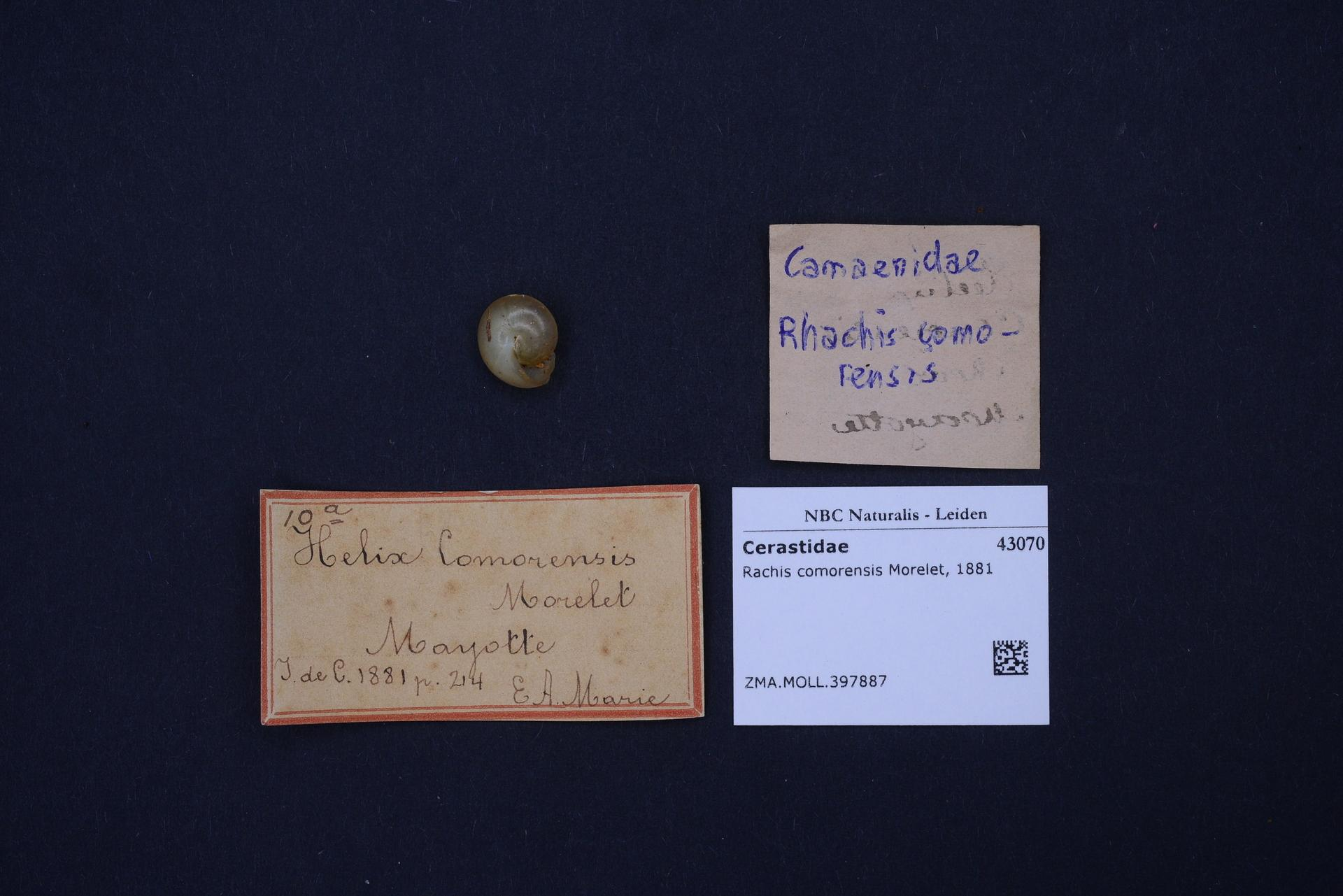

Conservation status
- Extinct (IUCN 2.3)

Scientific classification
- Kingdom: Animalia
- Phylum: Mollusca
- Class: Gastropoda
- Order: Stylommatophora
- Family: Cerastidae
- Genus: Rachis
- Species: †R. comorensis

Binomial name
- †Rachis comorensis (Morelet, 1881)

= Rachis comorensis =

Extinct species of gastropod

Rachis comorensis is an extinct species of air-breathing land snail, a terrestrial pulmonate gastropod mollusc in the superfamily Enoidea. This species was endemic to Mayotte, an island in the Indian Ocean.
