= Euphorbia pirahazo =

Conservation status
- Critically endangered, possibly extinct (IUCN 3.1)

Scientific classification
- Kingdom: Plantae
- Clade: Embryophytes
- Clade: Tracheophytes
- Clade: Spermatophytes
- Clade: Angiosperms
- Clade: Eudicots
- Clade: Rosids
- Order: Malpighiales
- Family: Euphorbiaceae
- Genus: Euphorbia
- Species: E. pirahazo

Binomial name
- Euphorbia pirahazo Jum.

Species of flowering plant

Euphorbia pirahazo is a species of plant in the family Euphorbiaceae. It is endemic to Madagascar. Its natural habitat is subtropical or tropical dry forests. It is threatened by habitat loss.

More than 100 years ago this plant was over-collected for rubber production, but it has not been collected recently. It was thought to be nearly extinct by 1921. It is now "extremely rare if not extinct".
