= Gulella mayottensis =

Conservation status
- Extinct (IUCN 2.3)

Scientific classification
- Kingdom: Animalia
- Phylum: Mollusca
- Class: Gastropoda
- Order: Stylommatophora
- Family: Streptaxidae
- Genus: Gulella
- Species: †G. mayottensis

Binomial name
- †Gulella mayottensis Connolly, 1925

Species of gastropod

Gulella mayottensis was a species of very small air-breathing land snail, a terrestrial pulmonate gastropod mollusk in the family Streptaxidae. This species was endemic to Mayotte.
