= Oeceoclades seychellarum =

Conservation status
- Extinct (yes) (IUCN 3.1)

Scientific classification
- Kingdom: Plantae
- Clade: Tracheophytes
- Clade: Angiosperms
- Clade: Monocots
- Order: Asparagales
- Family: Orchidaceae
- Subfamily: Epidendroideae
- Genus: Oeceoclades
- Species: †O. seychellarum

Binomial name
- †Oeceoclades seychellarum (Rolfe ex Summerh.) Garay & P.Taylor

Synonyms
- Eulophia seychellarum Rolfe ex Summerh.; Eulophidium seychellarum (Rolfe ex Summerh.) Summerh.

Species of orchid

Oeceoclades seychellarum is a terrestrial orchid species in the genus Oeceoclades that was endemic to the island of Mahé in the Seychelles but is now considered to be extinct. Its sepals and petals are yellowish-white, while the labellum is white with some streaks. This species is only represented by the type specimen, collected in May 1902 from the Cascade Estate on the island of Mahé at an elevation of 900 feet (270 m) in what was then a mountain forest. The location from which the type specimen was collected is now degraded by human activity and invasive plants. Oeceoclades seychellarum was listed as being cultivated at the Royal Botanic Gardens, Kew in 1905, but not after that date.

It was first described by the English botanist V.S. Summerhayes in 1928 as Eulophia seychellarum, a name that Summerhayes based on an unpublished manuscript name provided by Robert Allen Rolfe. Summerhayes later moved the species to the genus Eulophidium in 1957 and it was again transferred to the genus Oeceoclades in 1976 by Leslie Andrew Garay and Peter Taylor. Garay and Taylor noted that this species is similar to O. lanceata in vegetative morphology, but these species differ in floral characteristics, especially in the shape and proportions of the labellum. The midlobe of the labellum in O. seychellarum is proportionally shorter than that of O. lanceata when compared to the length of the entire labellum.
