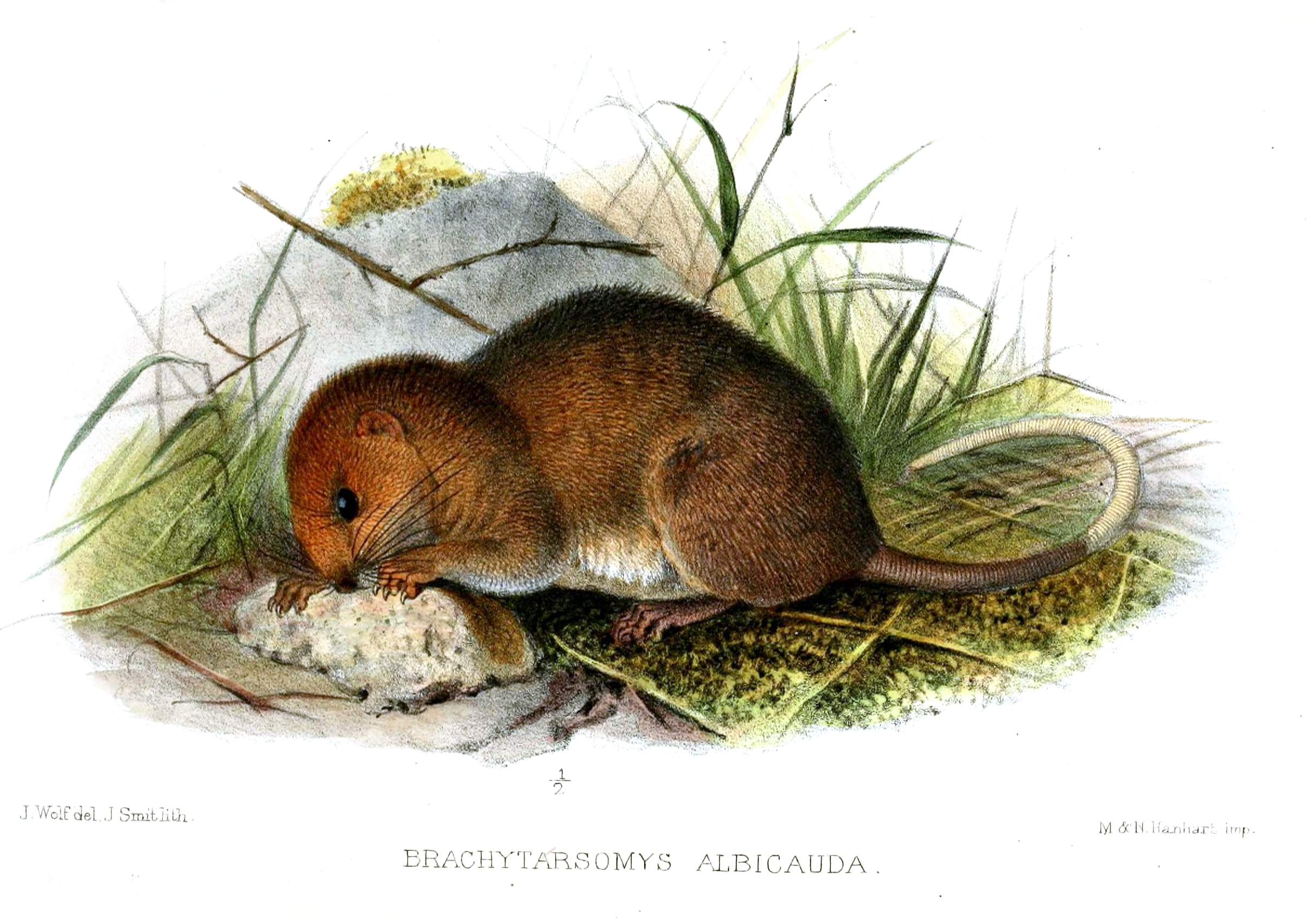

Conservation status
- Least Concern (IUCN 3.1)

Scientific classification
- Kingdom: Animalia
- Phylum: Chordata
- Class: Mammalia
- Order: Rodentia
- Family: Nesomyidae
- Genus: Brachytarsomys
- Species: B. albicauda

Binomial name
- Brachytarsomys albicauda Günther, 1875
- White-tailed antsangy range

= White-tailed antsangy =

Species of rodent

The white-tailed antsangy (Brachytarsomys albicauda) is a species of rodent in the family Nesomyidae. It is found only in Madagascar.

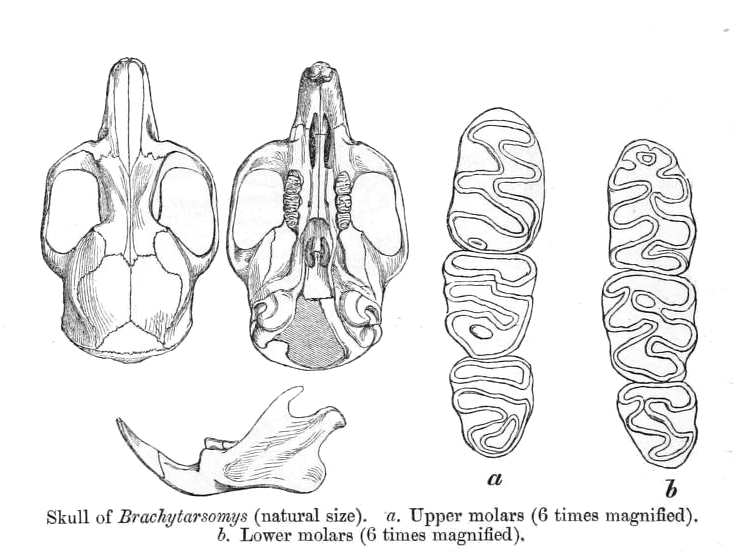
Skull
