= Brachytarsomys mahajambaensis =

Brachytarsomys mahajambaensis Temporal range: Late Pleistocene – Holocene

Scientific classification
- Kingdom: Animalia
- Phylum: Chordata
- Class: Mammalia
- Order: Rodentia
- Family: Nesomyidae
- Genus: Brachytarsomys
- Species: B. mahajambaensis

Binomial name
- Brachytarsomys mahajambaensis Mein et al., 2010

Extinct species of rodent

Brachytarsomys mahajambaensis is an extinct rodent from northwestern Madagascar. It is known from nine isolated molars found in several sites during fieldwork that started in 2001. First described in 2010, it is placed in the genus Brachytarsomys together with two larger living species, which may differ in some details of molar morphology. The presence of B. mahajambaensis, a rare element in the local rodent fauna, suggests that the region was previously more humid.

== Taxonomy ==
Remains of Brachytarsomys mahajambaensis were found during fieldwork in northwestern Madagascar that started in 2001. The species was described in a 2010 paper by Pierre Mein and colleagues, together with another extinct rodent, Nesomys narindaensis. The specific name, mahajambaensis, refers to Mahajamba Bay, which is close to the places where the species has been found. It is placed in the genus Brachytarsomys, together with two larger living species, B. albicauda and B. villosa. Brachytarsomys is classified in the exclusively Madagascan subfamily Nesomyinae of the family Nesomyidae, which includes various African rodents.

== Description ==
Brachytarsomys mahajambaensis is known from nine isolated molars, including two first upper molars (M1), one of which is broken, two-second upper molars (M2), one M3, two second lower molars (m2), and two m3. It is generally similar to the other two species, but smaller. There are a few differences in molar structure, which may not hold in larger samples.

Both the M1 and M2 have flat crowns. The M1 is convex on the lingual (inner) side and concave on the outer side, rendering it kidney-shaped. The anterocone, the cusp at the front of the tooth, appears not to be divided in two, as it is in living Brachytarsomys. It is narrowly connected to the protocone, another cusp behind it on the labial side, which is connected in the same way to the paracone. This lingually located cusp displays a broader connection to the hypocone on the labial side, which is isolated from the metacone lingually behind it. The metacone is broadly connected to another labial cusp behind it, referred to as the "post-hypocone", which it is expected to fuse to with increasing wear. Behind this pair of cusps, a small posteroloph (a crest at the back of the tooth) is present. In general, the back part of the tooth is more highly developed than in B. albicauda. The anterolingual cingulum on the M2, a crest on the front lingual corner, is absent or very small; it is well-developed in B. albicauda. The cusps form three transverse crests, with the labial cusp behind the lingual one. In one specimen, the second and third lophs are weakly connected. The posteroloph is more highly developed than on the M1. The M3 also has three such crests, which display narrow connections along the length of the tooth. In the first crest, the two cusps are about next to each other, but in the second one, the hypocone (on the labial side) is a bit behind the paracone. The post-hypocone and the metacone, in the third crest, are joined at the back. There are three roots, two at the front and one at the back, on the M1 and M2; the roots are missing from the only known M3.

Measurements of Brachytarsomys molars (Note: All measurements are in millimeters and in the form "length x width". No measurements for individual molars of B. villosa are available, but it is even larger than B. albicauda.)
Species	M1	M2	M3	m1	m2	m3
B. albicauda	3.5 x 2.38	2.75 x 2.27	2.08 x 1.94	3.04 x 2.03	2.74 x 2.24	2.46 x 2.03
B. mahajambaensis	2.73 x 1.79, – x 1.87	2.27 x 1.90, 2.43 x 2.02	1.78 x 1.75	–	2.41 x 1.93, 2.41 x 1.98	1.89 x 1.57, 2.23 x 1.76

The m1 is unknown. In m2, there are two well-developed transverse crests and one smaller one behind them. The first one consists of two cusps, the anteroconid (labial) and the metaconid (lingual) and the second one joins the protoconid at the labial side with the entoconid at the lingual side. The second crest is weakly joined to the third one, which joins the hypoconid at the labial side to the posteroconid at the back. In one specimen, a cingulum (ridge) is present at the back of the tooth and a small cusp, the ectostylid, is also present. The m3 becomes narrower towards the back, rendering its form triangular, and contains three crests. The first one again consists of the anteroconid and the metaconid and the second of the protoconid and the entoconid. The third is smaller and consists of the hypoconid with the posteroconid in one specimen, but in the other, the posteroconid is reduced to a narrow crest, the posterolophid. Unlike in B. albicauda, the hypoconid remains separate from the posterolophid and is not fused to it. Both m2 and m3 have two roots.

== Distribution and ecology ==
Teeth of Brachytarsomys mahajambaensis have been found at the sites of Antsingiavo, Belobaka, and Ambatomainty in northwestern Madagascar, which are late Pleistocene (126,000 to 10,000 years ago) and Holocene (less than 10,000 years ago) in age. Brachytarsomys is a rare element of the rodent fauna, which is dominated by multiple species of Eliurus and Macrotarsomys. Modern Brachytarsomys are large rats that live in trees and eat fruits at the middle to high altitudes. The modern, dry environment in northwestern Madagascar is decidedly inhospitable to these animals, and they no longer occur there; the former presence of B. mahajambaensis could indicate that the region was more humid in the past.

== Literature cited ==
- Mein, P., Sénégas, F., Gommery, D., Ramanivoso, B., Randrianantenaina, H. and Kerloc'h, P. 2010. Nouvelles espèces subfossiles de rongeurs du Nord-Ouest de Madagascar (subscription required). Comptes Rendus Palevol 9(3):101–112 (in French, with abridged English version).
- Musser, G.G. and Carleton, M.D. 2005. Superfamily Muroidea. Pp. 894–1531 in Wilson, D.E. and Reeder, D.M. (eds.). Mammal Species of the World: a taxonomic and geographic reference. 3rd ed. Baltimore: The Johns Hopkins University Press, 2 vols., 2142 pp. ISBN 978-0-8018-8221-0
