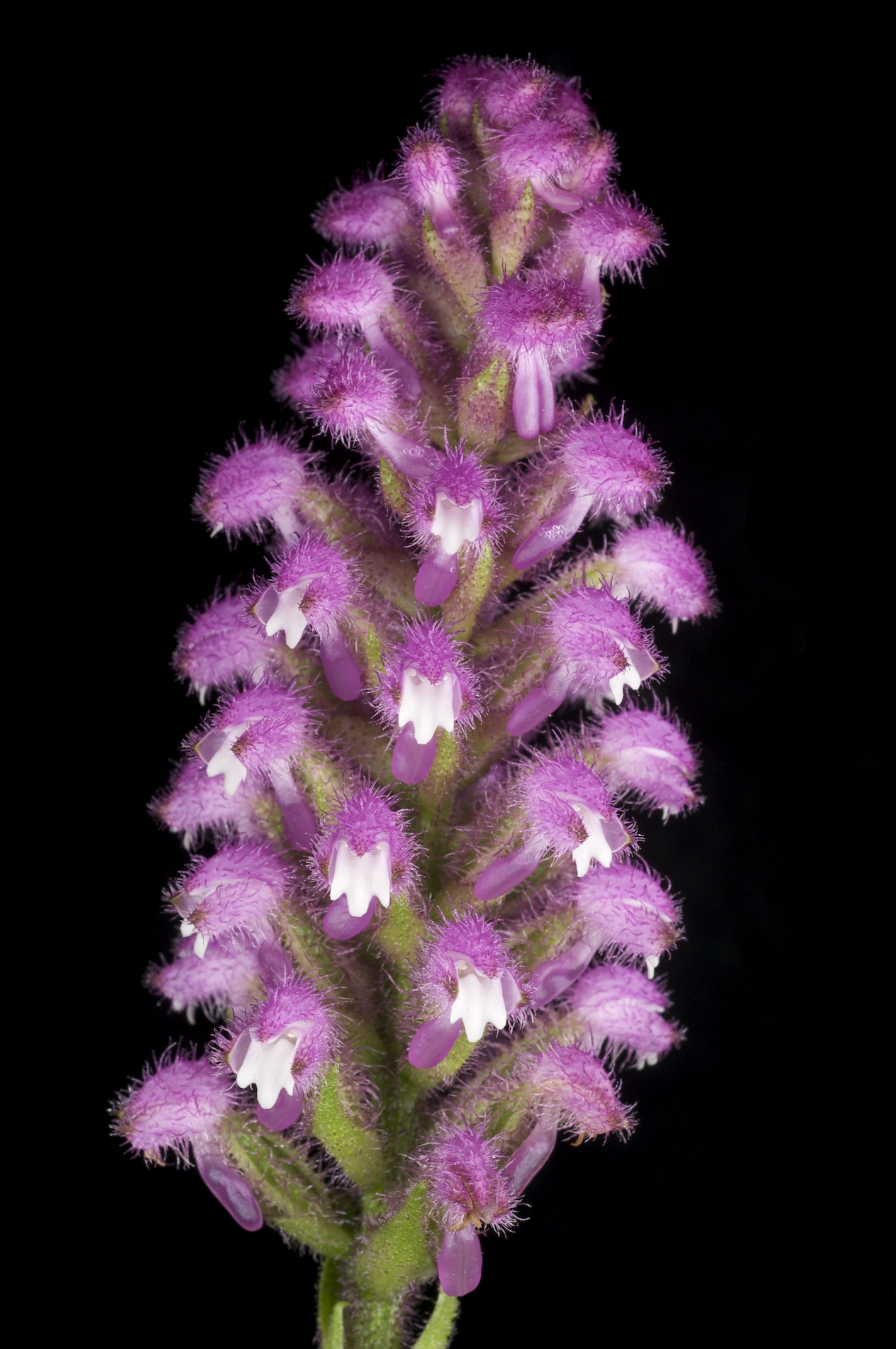
- Flowers of Cynorkis villosa

Scientific classification
- Kingdom: Plantae
- Clade: Tracheophytes
- Clade: Angiosperms
- Clade: Monocots
- Order: Asparagales
- Family: Orchidaceae
- Subfamily: Orchidoideae
- Tribe: Orchideae
- Subtribe: Orchidinae
- Genus: Cynorkis; Thouars

Type species
- Cynorkis fastigiata Thouars

Synonyms
- Acrostylia Frapp. ex Cordem.; Amphorkis Thouars; Arnottia A.Rich.; Barlaea Rchb.f.; Bicornella Lindl.; Camilleugenia Frapp. ex Cordem.; Cynorchis Thouars; Cynosorchis Thouars; Forsythmajoria Kraenzl. ex Schltr.; Helorchis Schltr.; Hemiperis Frapp. ex Cordem.; Imerinorchis Szlach.; Lemuranthe Schltr.; Lowiorchis Szlach.; Microtheca Schltr.; Monadeniorchis Szlach. & Kras; Physoceras Schltr.

= Cynorkis =

Genus of orchids

Cynorkis is a genus of orchids in the subtribe Orchidinae. Species in this genus are native to mainland Africa, the Comoro Islands, the Mascarene Islands, and Madagascar.

== Species ==
As of August 2023, Plants of the World Online accepted the following species:

- Cynorkis aconitiflora Hermans, Andriant. & Sieder
- Cynorkis alborubra Schltr.
- Cynorkis ambondrombensis Boiteau
- Cynorkis ampullacea H.Perrier ex Hermans
- Cynorkis ampullifera H.Perrier
- Cynorkis anacamptoides Kraenzl.
- Cynorkis andohahelensis H.Perrier
- Cynorkis andringitrana Schltr.
- Cynorkis angustipetala Ridl.
- Cynorkis anisoloba Summerh.
- Cynorkis ankaranensis Hervouet
- Cynorkis aphylla Schltr.
- Cynorkis aristei (J.-B.Castillon) P.J.Cribb & Hermans
- Cynorkis aurantiaca Ridl.
- Cynorkis australis (Boiteau) Hermans & P.J.Cribb
- Cynorkis bardotiana Bosser
- Cynorkis baronii Rolfe
- Cynorkis bathiei Schltr.
- Cynorkis betsileensis Kraenzl.
- Cynorkis betsomangensis (Bosser) Hermans & P.J.Cribb
- Cynorkis bifurca (H.Perrier) Hermans & P.J.Cribb
- Cynorkis bimaculata (Ridl.) H.Perrier
- Cynorkis bobyi Hermans & P.J.Cribb
- Cynorkis boinana Schltr.
- Cynorkis borbonica Pailler
- Cynorkis boryana (A.Rich.) Lindl.
- Cynorkis brachyceras Schltr.
- Cynorkis brachystachya Bosser
- Cynorkis brevicalcar P.J.Cribb
- Cynorkis brevicornu Ridl.
- Cynorkis breviplectra (Frapp. ex Cordem.) Schltr.
- Cynorkis buchananii Rolfe
- Cynorkis buchwaldiana Kraenzl.
- Cynorkis cadetii Bosser
- Cynorkis calanthoides Kraenzl.
- Cynorkis calcarata (Thouars) T.Durand & Schinz
- Cynorkis cardiophylla Schltr.
- Cynorkis castillonii (P.Bernet) Hermans & P.J.Cribb
- Cynorkis catatii Bosser
- Cynorkis christae Hermans, Andriant. & Sieder
- Cynorkis cinnabarina (Rolfe) Hermans & P.J.Cribb
- Cynorkis citrata (Thouars) P.Bernet
- Cynorkis clarae Geerinck
- Cynorkis coccinelloides (Frapp. ex Cordem.) Schltr.
- Cynorkis commersoniana (A.Rich.) Kraenzl.
- Cynorkis commersonii Rchb.f.
- Cynorkis comorensis Bosser
- Cynorkis compacta Rchb.f.
- Cynorkis confusa H.Perrier
- Cynorkis constellata (Frapp. ex Cordem.) Schltr.
- Cynorkis cuneilabia Schltr.
- Cynorkis debilis (Hook.f.) Summerh.
- Cynorkis decaryana H.Perrier ex Hermans
- Cynorkis dens-serpens Hermans & P.J.Cribb
- Cynorkis discolor (Frapp. ex Cordem.) Schltr.
- Cynorkis disperidoides Bosser
- Cynorkis elegans Rchb.f.
- Cynorkis elephantina Hermans, Andriant. & Sieder
- Cynorkis epiphytica (Schltr.) Hermans & P.J.Cribb
- Cynorkis ericophila H.Perrier ex Hermans
- Cynorkis exilis (Frapp. ex Cordem.) Schltr.
- Cynorkis falcata (Frapp. ex Cordem.) Schltr.
- Cynorkis fastigiata Thouars
- Cynorkis filiformis Schltr.
- Cynorkis fimbriata H.Perrier ex Hermans
- Cynorkis flabellifera H.Perrier
- Cynorkis flexuosa Lindl.
- Cynorkis flexuosatis (Thouars) Hermans
- Cynorkis formosa Bosser
- Cynorkis gabonensis Summerh.
- Cynorkis gibbosa Ridl.
- Cynorkis gigas Schltr.
- Cynorkis glandulosa Ridl.
- Cynorkis globifera H.Perrier
- Cynorkis globosa Schltr.
- Cynorkis globulosa (Frapp. ex Cordem.) Schltr.
- Cynorkis graminea (Thouars) Schltr.
- Cynorkis gymnochiloides (Schltr.) H.Perrier
- Cynorkis henrici Schltr.
- Cynorkis hispidula Ridl.
- Cynorkis hologlossa Schltr.
- Cynorkis humbertii Bosser
- Cynorkis humblotiana Kraenzl.
- Cynorkis hyacinthina Hermans & P.J.Cribb
- Cynorkis imbellis (Frapp. ex Cordem.) Hermans & P.J.Cribb
- Cynorkis inermis (Thouars) Hermans & P.J.Cribb
- Cynorkis jackyi Hermans & Sieder
- Cynorkis jumelleana Schltr.
- Cynorkis kassneriana Kraenzl.
- Cynorkis kirkii Rolfe
- Cynorkis lagenifera (H.Perrier) Hermans & P.J.Cribb
- Cynorkis lancilabia Schltr.
- Cynorkis latipetala H.Perrier
- Cynorkis leandriana (H.Perrier) Hervouet
- Cynorkis lemurica Bosser
- Cynorkis lentiginosa Hermans, Andriant. & Sieder
- Cynorkis lilacina Ridl.
- Cynorkis lindleyana Hermans
- Cynorkis lowiana Rchb.f.
- Cynorkis mammuthus Hermans & P.J.Cribb
- Cynorkis mangabensis Hermans & P.J.Cribb
- Cynorkis marojejyensis Bosser
- Cynorkis melinantha Schltr.
- Cynorkis mellitula Toill.-Gen. & Bosser
- Cynorkis mesophylla Schltr.
- Cynorkis micrantha (Frapp. ex Cordem.) Schltr.
- Cynorkis minuticalcar Toill.-Gen. & Bosser
- Cynorkis × mirabile Hermans & P.J.Cribb
- Cynorkis monadenia H.Perrier
- Cynorkis muscicola Bosser
- Cynorkis nutans (Ridl.) H.Perrier
- Cynorkis ochroglossa Schltr.
- Cynorkis ochyrae Szlach. & Olszewski
- Cynorkis orchioides Schltr.
- Cynorkis papilio Bosser
- Cynorkis papillosa (Ridl.) Summerh.
- Cynorkis paradoxa (Frapp. ex Cordem.) Schltr.
- Cynorkis parvula Schltr.
- Cynorkis pelicanides (Frapp. ex Cordem.) Schltr.
- Cynorkis perrieri Schltr.
- Cynorkis petiolata H.Perrier
- Cynorkis peyrotii Bosser
- Cynorkis pinguicularioides H.Perrier ex Hermans
- Cynorkis pleistadenia (Rchb.f.) Schltr.
- Cynorkis prehsleri Hermans & Sieder
- Cynorkis pseudorolfei H.Perrier
- Cynorkis purpurascens Thouars
- Cynorkis purpurea (Thouars) Kraenzl.
- Cynorkis quinqueloba H.Perrier ex Hermans
- Cynorkis quinquepartita H.Perrier ex Hermans
- Cynorkis × ranaivosonii Hermans
- Cynorkis ridleyi T.Durand & Schinz
- Cynorkis ringens (Frapp. ex Cordem.) Schltr.
- Cynorkis rolfei Hochr.
- Cynorkis rosellata (Thouars) Bosser
- Cynorkis rotundifolia (H.Perrier) Hermans & P.J.Cribb
- Cynorkis rungweensis Schltr.
- Cynorkis sacculata Schltr.
- Cynorkis sagittata H.Perrier
- Cynorkis sambiranoensis Schltr.
- Cynorkis sanguinolenta Hermans, L.Gaut. & P.J.Cribb
- Cynorkis saxicola Schltr.
- Cynorkis schlechteri H.Perrier
- Cynorkis schmidtii (Kraenzl.) Schltr.
- Cynorkis siederi Hermans & Andriant.
- Cynorkis sigmoidea Kraenzl.
- Cynorkis simplex (Frapp. ex Cordem.) Hermans & P.J.Cribb
- Cynorkis sororia Schltr.
- Cynorkis souegesii Bosser & Veyret
- Cynorkis spatulata H.Perrier ex Hermans
- Cynorkis speciosa Ridl.
- Cynorkis squamosa (Poir.) Lindl.
- Cynorkis stolonifera (Schltr.) Schltr.
- Cynorkis subtilis Bosser
- Cynorkis summerhayesiana Geerinck
- Cynorkis sylvatica Bosser
- Cynorkis symoensii Geerinck & Tournay
- Cynorkis syringescens Hermans & P.J.Cribb
- Cynorkis tamponensis Schltr.
- Cynorkis tenella Ridl.
- Cynorkis tenerrima (Ridl.) Kraenzl.
- Cynorkis tenuicalcar Schltr.
- Cynorkis tristis Bosser
- Cynorkis tryphioides Schltr.
- Cynorkis uliginosa Bosser
- Cynorkis uncata (Rolfe) Kraenzl.
- Cynorkis unguiculata Hermans & P.J.Cribb
- Cynorkis uniflora Lindl.
- Cynorkis usambarae Rolfe
- Cynorkis verrucosa Bosser
- Cynorkis villosa Rolfe
- Cynorkis violacea Schltr.
- Cynorkis volombato Bosser
- Cynorkis windsorensis Hervouet
- Cynorkis zaratananae Schltr.

== See also ==
- List of Orchidaceae genera
