= Tropidophora semilineata =

Conservation status
- Extinct (IUCN 2.3)

Scientific classification
- Kingdom: Animalia
- Phylum: Mollusca
- Class: Gastropoda
- Subclass: Caenogastropoda
- Order: Littorinimorpha
- Family: Pomatiidae
- Genus: Tropidophora
- Species: †T. semilineata

Binomial name
- †Tropidophora semilineata P.M.A. Morelet, 1881

Species of gastropod

Tropidophora semilineata was a species of land snail with a gill and an operculum, a terrestrial gastropod mollusk in the family Pomatiidae. This species was endemic to Mayotte. It is now extinct.
