= Vernonia sechellensis =

Conservation status
- Extinct (IUCN 3.1)

Scientific classification
- Kingdom: Plantae
- Clade: Tracheophytes
- Clade: Angiosperms
- Clade: Eudicots
- Clade: Asterids
- Order: Asterales
- Family: Asteraceae
- Genus: Vernonia
- Species: †V. sechellensis

Binomial name
- †Vernonia sechellensis Baker

Extinct species of flowering plant

Vernonia sechellensis was a species of plant in the daisy family Asteraceae. It has not been seen since its original discovery on the island of Mahé in 1874. It was endemic to the Seychelles.
