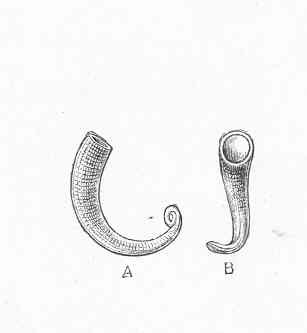

Conservation status
- Extinct (IUCN 2.3)

Scientific classification
- Kingdom: Animalia
- Phylum: Mollusca
- Class: Gastropoda
- Subclass: Caenogastropoda
- Order: Architaenioglossa
- Family: Cyclophoridae
- Subfamily: Cyclophorinae
- Tribe: Cyclophorini
- Genus: †Cyclosurus; Morelet, 1881
- Species: †C. mariei

Binomial name
- †Cyclosurus mariei Morelet, 1881

= Cyclosurus mariei =

Species of gastropod

Cyclosurus mariei is an extinct species of small, air-breathing, land snails with an operculum, terrestrial pulmonate gastropod molluscs in the family Cyclophoridae.

This species was endemic to Mayotte. It is now extinct.
