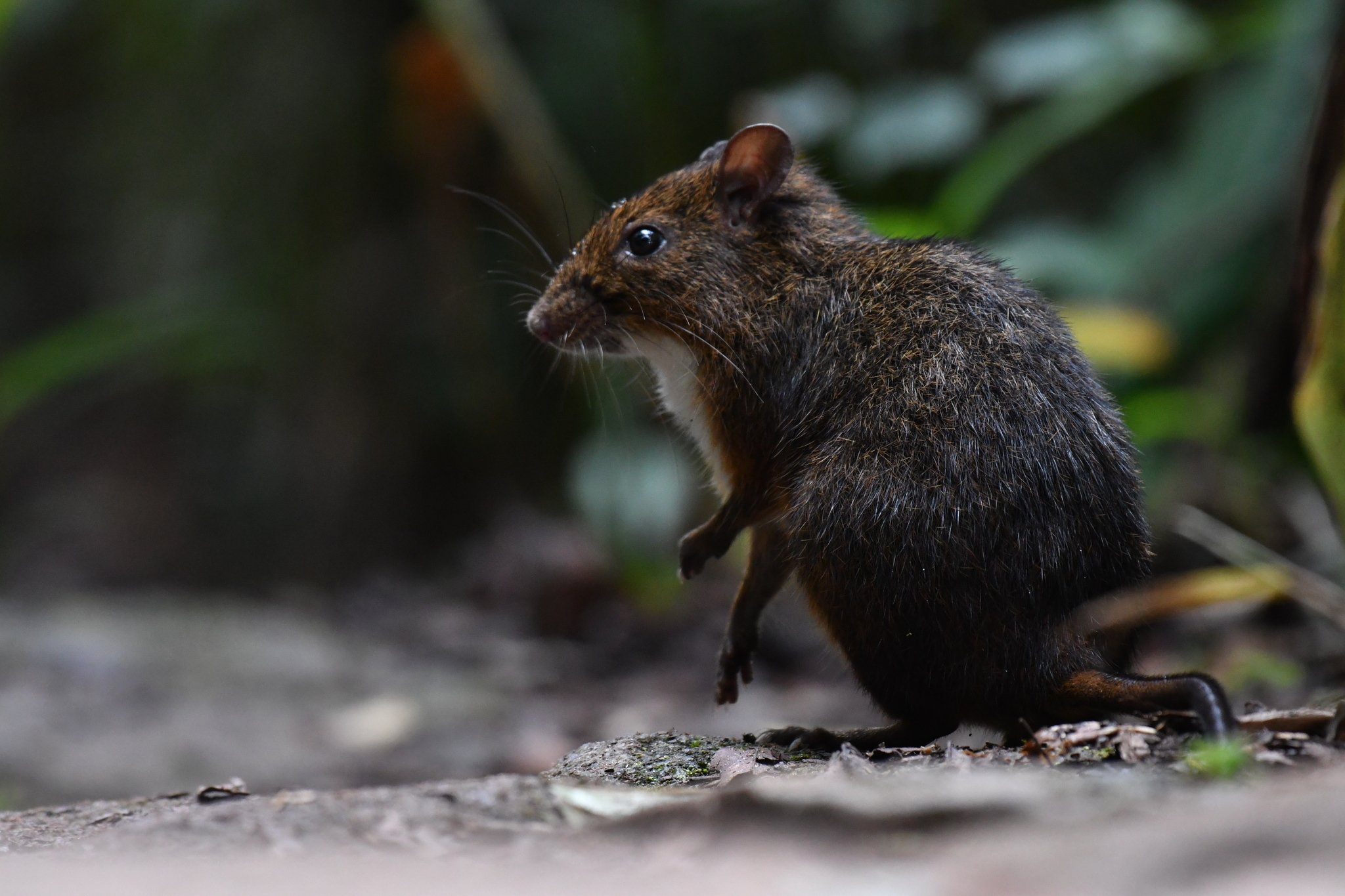

Conservation status
- Least Concern (IUCN 3.1)

Scientific classification
- Kingdom: Animalia
- Phylum: Chordata
- Class: Mammalia
- Order: Rodentia
- Family: Nesomyidae
- Genus: Nesomys
- Species: N. audeberti

Binomial name
- Nesomys audeberti Jentink, 1879

= White-bellied nesomys =

Species of rodent

The white-bellied nesomys (Nesomys audeberti), also known as the lowland red forest rat, is a species of rat endemic to Madagascar.
