= Andrahomana Cave =

Complex of sinkholes in south eastern Madagascar

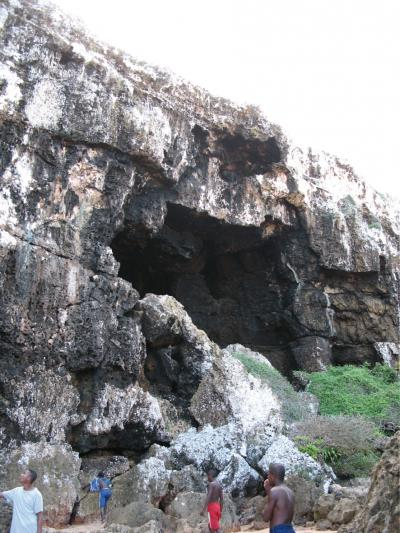
- Andrahomana cave

- Location within Madagascar
- Location: Andranobory (Anosy, Madagascar)
- Coordinates: 25°7′S 46°31′E

The Andrahomana Cave is a complex of sinkholes in Andranobory (Anosy region, near Fort-Dauphin) in south eastern Madagascar.

== Megafauna ==
It is remarkable due to the number of fossils of extinct megafauna of the island. It is where were found, among other animals, fossils of the giant lemur Hadropithecus stenognathus, the pygmy hippo Hippopotamus lemerlei, and the giant land tortoise Aldabrachelys grandidieri.
