= List of deomyines =

Species in mammal subfamily Deomyinae

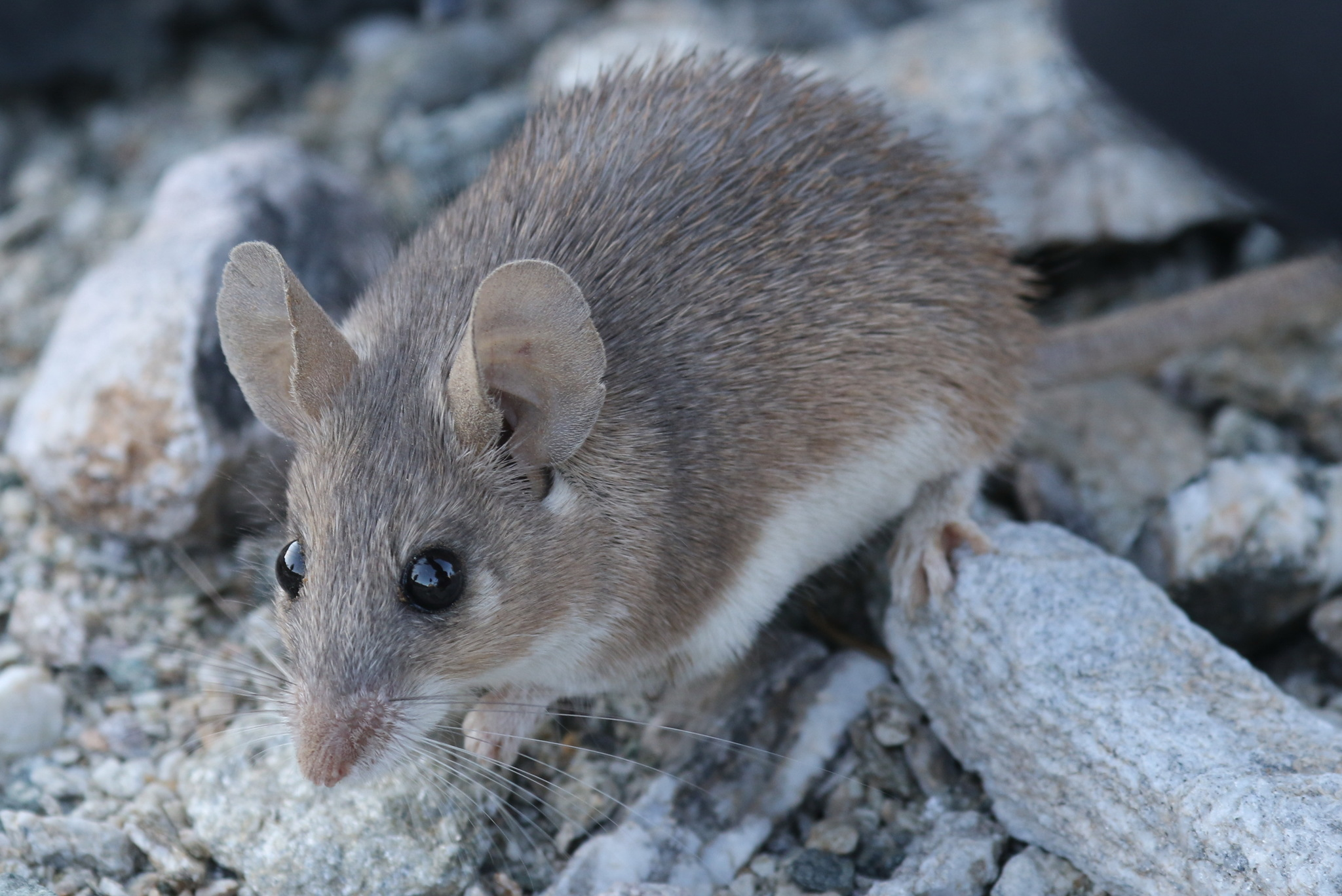
Eastern spiny mouse (Acomys dimidiatus)

Deomyinae is a subfamily of mammals in the rodent family Muridae, which in turn is part of the Myomorpha suborder in the order Rodentia. Members of this subfamily are called deomyines and include spiny mice and brush-furred rats. They are found in Africa, the Middle East, and Mediterranean islands, primarily in shrublands, grasslands, rocky areas, and forests, though some species can be found in deserts and savannas. They range in size from the Southern African spiny mouse, at 7 cm (3 in) plus a 6 cm (2 in) tail, to the black-clawed brush-furred rat, at 18 cm (7 in) plus a 10 cm (4 in) tail. Deomyines generally eat insects, grain, and grass, as well as other invertebrates and vegetation, frogs, and other small vertebrates. No deomyines have population estimates, but three species—the Mount Chercher brush-furred rat, Sheko Forest brush-furred rat, and Dieterlen's brush-furred mouse—are categorized as endangered, and one species—the Mount Lefo brush-furred mouse—is categorized as critically endangered.

The 55 extant species of Deomyinae are divided into 4 genera, ranging in size from 1 to 31 species. Several extinct prehistoric deomyine species have been discovered, though due to ongoing research and discoveries, the exact number and categorization are not fixed.

== Conventions ==
IUCN Red List categories
Conservation status
- EX: Extinct (0 species)
- EW: Extinct in the wild (0 species)
- CR: Critically endangered (1 species)
- EN: Endangered (3 species)
- VU: Vulnerable (2 species)
- NT: Near threatened (2 species)
- LC: Least concern (30 species)

Other categories
- DD: Data deficient (9 species)
- NE: Not evaluated (8 species)

The author citation for the species or genus is given after the scientific name; parentheses around the author citation indicate that this was not the original taxonomic placement. Conservation status codes listed follow the International Union for Conservation of Nature (IUCN) Red List of Threatened Species. Range maps are provided wherever possible; if a range map is not available, a description of the deomyine's range is provided. Ranges are based on the IUCN Red List for that species unless otherwise noted.

== Classification ==
Deomyinae is a subfamily of the rodent family Muridae consisting of 55 extant species in 4 genera. These genera range in size from 1 to 31 species. This does not include hybrid species or extinct prehistoric species.

Subfamily Deomyinae

- Genus Acomys (spiny mice): twenty-two species
- Genus Deomys (link rat): one species
- Genus Lophuromys (brush-furred rats): thirty-one species
- Genus Uranomys (Rudd's mouse): one species

- Deomyinae
  - Uranomys
  - - Acomys
    - - Deomys
      - Lophuromys

== Deomyines ==
The following classification is based on the taxonomy described by the reference work Mammal Species of the World (2005), with augmentation by generally accepted proposals made since using molecular phylogenetic analysis, as supported by both the IUCN and the American Society of Mammalogists.

Genus Acomys – I. Geoffroy, 1838 – 22 species
Common name	Scientific name and subspecies	Range	Size and ecology	IUCN status and estimated population
Asia Minor spiny mouse	A. cilicicus Spitzenberger, 1978	Southern Turkey	Size: 9–13 cm (4–5 in) long, plus 9–12 cm (4–5 in) tail Habitat: Shrubland and rocky areas Diet: Omnivorous, but primarily grain, grass, and other plant material	DD Unknown
Cairo spiny mouse	A. cahirinus (É. Geoffrey, 1803)	Northern Africa	Size: 10–12 cm (4–5 in) long, plus 9–14 cm (4–6 in) tail Habitat: Shrubland and rocky areas Diet: Omnivorous, but primarily grain, grass, and other plant material	LC Unknown
Cape spiny mouse	A. subspinosus (Waterhouse, 1838)	Southern South Africa	Size: 7–11 cm (3–4 in) long, plus 6–9 cm (2–4 in) tail Habitat: Rocky areas and shrubland Diet: Omnivorous, but primarily grain, grass, and other plant material	LC Unknown
Chudeau's spiny mouse	A. chudeaui Kollmann, 1911	Northwestern Africa	Size: 9–12 cm (4–5 in) long, plus 7–13 cm (3–5 in) tail Habitat: Shrubland and rocky areas Diet: Omnivorous, but primarily grain, grass, and other plant material	NE Unknown
Crete spiny mouse	A. minous (Bate, 1906)	Crete	Size: 9–13 cm (4–5 in) long, plus 8–12 cm (3–5 in) tail Habitat: Rocky areas and shrubland Diet: Omnivorous, but primarily grain, grass, and other plant material	DD Unknown
Cyprus spiny mouse	A. nesiotes (Bate, 1903)	Cyprus	Size: 9–14 cm (4–6 in) long, plus 9–12 cm (4–5 in) tail Habitat: Rocky areas Diet: Omnivorous, but primarily grain, grass, and other plant material	DD Unknown
Eastern spiny mouse	A. dimidiatus (Cretzschmar, 1826)	Southwestern Asia and eastern Egypt	Size: 8–13 cm (3–5 in) long, plus 8–12 cm (3–5 in) tail Habitat: Rocky areas, shrubland, forest, grassland, and desert Diet: Omnivorous, but primarily grain, grass, and other plant material	LC Unknown
Fiery spiny mouse	A. ignitus Dollman, 1910	Southern Kenya and northeastern Tanzania	Size: 9–12 cm (4–5 in) long, plus 7–9 cm (3–4 in) tail Habitat: Savanna and rocky areas Diet: Omnivorous, but primarily grain, grass, and other plant material	LC Unknown
Golden spiny mouse	A. russatus (Wagner, 1840)	Southwestern Asia and eastern Egypt	Size: 10–12 cm (4–5 in) long, plus 6–8 cm (2–3 in) tail Habitat: Rocky areas Diet: Omnivorous, but primarily grain, grass, and other plant material	LC Unknown
Gray spiny mouse	A. cineraceus Fitzinger & Heuglin, 1866	Eastern Africa	Size: 8–12 cm (3–5 in) long, plus 7–13 cm (3–5 in) tail Habitat: Rocky areas, savanna, shrubland, and grassland Diet: Omnivorous, but primarily grain, grass, and other plant material	LC Unknown
Johan's spiny mouse	A. johannis Thomas, 1912	Western Africa	Size: 9–13 cm (4–5 in) long, plus 8–12 cm (3–5 in) tail Habitat: Rocky areas, grassland, and shrubland Diet: Omnivorous, but primarily grain, grass, and other plant material	LC Unknown
Kemp's spiny mouse	A. kempi Dollman, 1911	Southwestern Asia and eastern Egypt	Size: 9–11 cm (4–4 in) long, plus 8–10 cm (3–4 in) tail Habitat: Savanna and rocky areas Diet: Omnivorous, but primarily grain, grass, and other plant material	LC Unknown
Louise's spiny mouse	A. louisae Thomas, 1896	Eastern Africa	Size: 7–10 cm (3–4 in) long, plus 8–11 cm (3–4 in) tail Habitat: Savanna, rocky areas, and grassland Diet: Omnivorous, but primarily grain, grass, and other plant material	LC Unknown
Mullah spiny mouse	A. mullah Thomas, 1904	Eastern Africa	Size: 10–14 cm (4–6 in) long, plus 9–12 cm (4–5 in) tail Habitat: Shrubland and rocky areas Diet: Omnivorous, but primarily grain, grass, and other plant material	LC Unknown
Muze spiny mouse	A. muzei Verheyen, Hulselmans, Wendelen, Leirs, Corti, Backeljau, & Verheyen, 2011	Eastern Africa	Size: 7–10 cm (3–4 in) long, plus 7–11 cm (3–4 in) tail Habitat: Forest Diet: Omnivorous, but primarily grain, grass, and other plant material	LC Unknown
Nguru spiny mouse	A. ngurui Verheyen, Hulselmans, Wendelen, Leirs, Corti, Backeljau, & Verheyen, 2011	Eastern Africa	Size: 7–11 cm (3–4 in) long, plus 6–9 cm (2–4 in) tail Habitat: Forest Diet: Omnivorous, but primarily grain, grass, and other plant material	LC Unknown
Percival's spiny mouse	A. percivali Dollman, 1911	Eastern Africa	Size: 8–12 cm (3–5 in) long, plus 3–10 cm (1–4 in) tail Habitat: Savanna, shrubland, and rocky areas Diet: Omnivorous, but primarily grain, grass, and other plant material	LC Unknown
Selous's spiny mouse	A. selousi de Winton, 1896	Southern Africa	Size: 7–10 cm (3–4 in) long, plus 7–10 cm (3–4 in) tail Habitat: Forest, rocky areas, and shrubland Diet: Omnivorous, but primarily grain, grass, and other plant material	LC Unknown
Seurat's spiny mouse	A. seurati Heim de Balsac, 1936	Southern Algeria	Size: 8–10 cm (3–4 in) long, plus 10–13 cm (4–5 in) tail Habitat: Desert and rocky areas Diet: Omnivorous, but primarily grain, grass, and other plant material	LC Unknown
Southern African spiny mouse	A. spinosissimus Peters, 1852	Southeastern Africa	Size: 7–10 cm (3–4 in) long, plus 6–9 cm (2–4 in) tail Habitat: Rocky areas and savanna Diet: Omnivorous, but primarily grain, grass, and other plant material	LC Unknown
Western Saharan spiny mouse	A. airensis Thomas & Hinton, 1921	Western Africa	Size: 9–12 cm (4–5 in) long, plus 7–13 cm (3–5 in) tail Habitat: Shrubland and rocky areas Diet: Omnivorous, but primarily grain, grass, and other plant material	LC Unknown
Wilson's spiny mouse	A. wilsoni Thomas, 1892	Eastern Africa	Size: 8–12 cm (3–5 in) long, plus 6–10 cm (2–4 in) tail Habitat: Rocky areas, shrubland, and savanna Diet: Omnivorous, but primarily grain, grass, and other plant material	LC Unknown

Genus Deomys – Thomas, 1888 – one species
Common name	Scientific name and subspecies	Range	Size and ecology	IUCN status and estimated population
Link rat	D. ferrugineus Thomas, 1888	Central Africa	Size: 10–15 cm (4–6 in) long, plus 15–20 cm (6–8 in) tail Habitat: Inland wetlands and forest Diet: Insects and other invertebrates, as well as vegetable matter	LC Unknown

Genus Lophuromys – Peters, 1874 – 31 species
Common name	Scientific name and subspecies	Range	Size and ecology	IUCN status and estimated population
Angolan brush-furred rat	L. angolensis Verheyen, Dierckx, & Hulselmans, 2000	Angola and southwestern Democratic Republic of the Congo	Size: 11–16 cm (4–6 in) long, plus 5–9 cm (2–4 in) tail Habitat: Grassland and forest Diet: Insects, as well as other invertebrates, frogs, other small vertebrates, and vegetation	NE Unknown
Ansorge's brush-furred rat	L. ansorgei (de Winton, 1896)	Western Africa	Size: 10–17 cm (4–7 in) long, plus 4–10 cm (2–4 in) tail Habitat: Grassland and forest Diet: Insects, as well as other invertebrates, frogs, other small vertebrates, and vegetation	NE Unknown
Black-clawed brush-furred rat	L. melanonyx Petter, 1972	Ethiopia	Size: 12–18 cm (5–7 in) long, plus 3–10 cm (1–4 in) tail Habitat: Grassland and forest Diet: Insects, as well as other invertebrates, frogs, other small vertebrates, and vegetation	VU Unknown
Dark-colored brush-furred rat	L. cinereus Dieterlen & Gelmroth, 1974	Eastern Democratic Republic of the Congo	Size: 11–13 cm (4–5 in) long, plus 6–8 cm (2–3 in) tail Habitat: Forest and grassland Diet: Insects, as well as other invertebrates, frogs, other small vertebrates, and vegetation	DD Unknown
Dieterlen's brush-furred mouse	L. dieterleni Verheyen, Hulselmans, Colyn, & Hutterer, 1997	Western Cameroon	Size: 11–13 cm (4–5 in) long, plus 7–8 cm (3–3 in) tail Habitat: Forest Diet: Insects, as well as other invertebrates, frogs, other small vertebrates, and vegetation	EN Unknown
Dudu's brush-furred rat	L. dudui Verheyen, Hulselmans, Dierckx, & Verheyen, 2002	Northeastern Democratic Republic of the Congo	Size: 8–13 cm (3–5 in) long, plus 5–8 cm (2–3 in) tail Habitat: Grassland and forest Diet: Insects, as well as other invertebrates, frogs, other small vertebrates, and vegetation	NE Unknown
Ethiopian forest brush-furred rat	L. chrysopus Osgood, 1936	Ethiopia	Size: 10–13 cm (4–5 in) long, plus 7–9 cm (3–4 in) tail Habitat: Forest Diet: Insects, as well as other invertebrates, frogs, other small vertebrates, and vegetation	LC Unknown
Fire-bellied brush-furred rat	L. nudicaudus Heller, 1911	Western Africa	Size: 8–12 cm (3–5 in) long, plus 4–8 cm (2–3 in) tail Habitat: Forest Diet: Insects, as well as other invertebrates, frogs, other small vertebrates, and vegetation	LC Unknown
Gray brush-furred rat	L. aquilus (True, 1892)	Democratic Republic of the Congo	Size: 11–15 cm (4–6 in) long, plus 6–9 cm (2–4 in) tail Habitat: Grassland and forest Diet: Insects, as well as other invertebrates, frogs, other small vertebrates, and vegetation	NE Unknown
Hutterer's brush-furred mouse	L. huttereri Verheyen, Colyn, & Hulselmans, 1996	Democratic Republic of the Congo	Size: 9–12 cm (4–5 in) long, plus 5–7 cm (2–3 in) tail Habitat: Forest Diet: Insects, as well as other invertebrates, frogs, other small vertebrates, and vegetation	LC Unknown
Kilonzo's brush furred rat	L. kilonzoi Verheyen, Hulselmans, Dierckx, Mulungu, Leirs, Corti, & Verheyen, 2007	Eastern Tanzania	Size: 11–14 cm (4–6 in) long, plus 5–10 cm (2–4 in) tail Habitat: Forest Diet: Insects, as well as other invertebrates, frogs, other small vertebrates, and vegetation	LC Unknown
Machangu's brush furred rat	L. machangui Verheyen, Hulselmans, Dierckx, Mulungu, Leirs, Corti, & Verheyen, 2007	Southeastern Africa	Size: 10–14 cm (4–6 in) long, plus 2–9 cm (1–4 in) tail Habitat: Shrubland and forest Diet: Insects, as well as other invertebrates, frogs, other small vertebrates, and vegetation	DD Unknown
Makundi's brush-furred rat	L. makundii Verheyen, Hulselmans, Dierckx, Mulungu, Leirs, Corti, & Verheyen, 2007	Tanzania	Size: 11–14 cm (4–6 in) long, plus 5–9 cm (2–4 in) tail Habitat: Shrubland and forest Diet: Insects, as well as other invertebrates, frogs, other small vertebrates, and vegetation	DD Unknown
Medium-tailed brush-furred rat	L. medicaudatus Dieterlen, 1975	Central Africa	Size: 9–12 cm (4–5 in) long, plus 7–10 cm (3–4 in) tail Habitat: Forest Diet: Insects, as well as other invertebrates, frogs, other small vertebrates, and vegetation	VU Unknown
Mount Cameroon brush-furred rat	L. roseveari Verheyen, Hulselmans, Colyn, & Hutterer, 1997	Western Cameroon	Size: 10–15 cm (4–6 in) long, plus 5–8 cm (2–3 in) tail Habitat: Forest, shrubland, and grassland Diet: Insects, as well as other invertebrates, frogs, other small vertebrates, and vegetation	LC Unknown
Mount Chercher brush-furred rat	L. chercherensis Lavrenchenko, Verheyen, Verheyen, Hulselmans, & Leirs, 2007	Ethiopia	Size: 11–15 cm (4–6 in) long, plus 6–7 cm (2–3 in) tail Habitat: Forest Diet: Insects, as well as other invertebrates, frogs, other small vertebrates, and vegetation	EN Unknown
Mount Lefo brush-furred mouse	L. eisentrauti Dieterlen, 1978	Western Cameroon	Size: 8–10 cm (3–4 in) long, plus 5–6 cm (2–2 in) tail Habitat: Forest Diet: Insects, as well as other invertebrates, frogs, other small vertebrates, and vegetation	CR Unknown
North Western Rift brush-furred rat	L. menageshae Lavrenchenko, Verheyen, Verheyen, Hulselmans, & Leirs, 2007	Central Ethiopia	Size: 12–15 cm (5–6 in) long, plus 6–8 cm (2–3 in) tail Habitat: Forest Diet: Insects, as well as other invertebrates, frogs, other small vertebrates, and vegetation	DD Unknown
Rahm's brush-furred rat	L. rahmi Verheyen, 1964	Central Africa	Size: 9–12 cm (4–5 in) long, plus 4–6 cm (2–2 in) tail Habitat: Forest Diet: Insects, as well as other invertebrates, frogs, other small vertebrates, and vegetation	NT Unknown
Rusty-bellied brush-furred rat	L. sikapusi (Temminck, 1853)	Western and central Africa	Size: 11–15 cm (4–6 in) long, plus 5–8 cm (2–3 in) tail Habitat: Grassland and forest Diet: Insects, as well as other invertebrates, frogs, other small vertebrates, and vegetation	LC Unknown
Sabuni's brush-furred rat	L. sabunii Verheyen, Hulselmans, Dierckx, Mulungu, Leirs, Corti, & Verheyen, 2007	Western Tanzania	Size: 11–15 cm (4–6 in) long, plus 3–8 cm (1–3 in) tail Habitat: Shrubland and forest Diet: Insects, as well as other invertebrates, frogs, other small vertebrates, and vegetation	DD Unknown
Sheko Forest brush-furred rat	L. pseudosikapusi Lavrenchenko, Verheyen, Verheyen, Hulselmans, & Leirs, 2007	Western Ethiopia	Size: 13–14 cm (5–6 in) long, plus 7–9 cm (3–4 in) tail Habitat: Forest Diet: Insects, as well as other invertebrates, frogs, other small vertebrates, and vegetation	EN Unknown
Short-tailed brush-furred rat	L. brevicaudus Osgood, 1936	Ethiopia	Size: 9–14 cm (4–6 in) long, plus 5–7 cm (2–3 in) tail Habitat: Shrubland and grassland Diet: Insects, as well as other invertebrates, frogs, other small vertebrates, and vegetation	NT Unknown
Simien brush-furred rat	L. simensis Osgood, 1936	Northern Ethiopia	Size: 11–15 cm (4–6 in) long, plus 5–9 cm (2–4 in) tail Habitat: Forest and grassland Diet: Insects, as well as other invertebrates, frogs, other small vertebrates, and vegetation	LC Unknown
Stanley's brush-furred rat	L. stanleyi Verheyen, Hulselmans, Dierckx, Mulungu, Leirs, Corti, & Verheyen, 2007	Eastern Democratic Republic of the Congo and western Uganda	Size: 11–13 cm (4–5 in) long, plus 4–8 cm (2–3 in) tail Habitat: Forest Diet: Insects, as well as other invertebrates, frogs, other small vertebrates, and vegetation	DD Unknown
Thomas's Ethiopian brush-furred rat	L. brunneus Thomas, 1906	Southern Ethiopia	Size: 10–14 cm (4–6 in) long, plus 5–9 cm (2–4 in) tail Habitat: Grassland and forest Diet: Insects, as well as other invertebrates, frogs, other small vertebrates, and vegetation	NE Unknown
Verhagen's brush-furred rat	L. verhageni Verheyen, Hulselmans, Dierckx, & Verheyen, 2002	Northern Tanzania	Size: 11–14 cm (4–6 in) long, plus 4–9 cm (2–4 in) tail Habitat: Grassland and forest Diet: Insects, as well as other invertebrates, frogs, other small vertebrates, and vegetation	NE Unknown
Woosnam's brush-furred rat	L. woosnami Thomas, 1906	Central Africa	Size: 10–14 cm (4–6 in) long, plus 10–14 cm (4–6 in) tail Habitat: Rocky areas, forest, and shrubland Diet: Insects, as well as other invertebrates, frogs, other small vertebrates, and vegetation	LC Unknown
Yellow-bellied brush-furred rat	L. luteogaster Dieterlen, 1975	Eastern Democratic Republic of the Congo	Size: 9–12 cm (4–5 in) long, plus 9–12 cm (4–5 in) tail Habitat: Forest Diet: Insects, as well as other invertebrates, frogs, other small vertebrates, and vegetation	LC Unknown
Yellow-spotted brush-furred rat	L. flavopunctatus Thomas, 1888	Central and eastern Africa	Size: 12–13 cm (5–5 in) long, plus 5–7 cm (2–3 in) tail Habitat: Grassland and forest Diet: Insects, as well as other invertebrates, frogs, other small vertebrates, and vegetation	LC Unknown
Zena's brush-furred rat	L. zena Dollman, 1909	Southern Kenya	Size: 10–14 cm (4–6 in) long, plus 4–9 cm (2–4 in) tail Habitat: Grassland and forest Diet: Insects, as well as other invertebrates, frogs, other small vertebrates, and vegetation	NE Unknown

Genus Uranomys – Dollman, 1909 – one species
Common name	Scientific name and subspecies	Range	Size and ecology	IUCN status and estimated population
Rudd's mouse	U. ruddi Dollman, 1909	Western, central, and eastern Africa	Size: 9–12 cm (4–5 in) long, plus 6–8 cm (2–3 in) tail Habitat: Savanna and shrubland Diet: Insects	LC Unknown

== Sources ==
- Chernasky, Amy; Motis, Anna; Burgin, Connor, eds. (2023). All the Mammals of the World. Lynx Nature Books. ISBN 978-84-16728-66-4.
- Nowak, Ronald M. (1999). Walker's Mammals of the World. Vol. 2 (6th ed.). Johns Hopkins University Press. ISBN 978-0-8018-5789-8.
- Musser, Guy G.; Carleton, Michael D. (2005). Wilson, Don E.; Reeder, DeeAnn M. (eds.). Mammal Species of the World. Vol. 2 (3rd ed.). Johns Hopkins University Press. ISBN 978-0-8018-8221-0.
