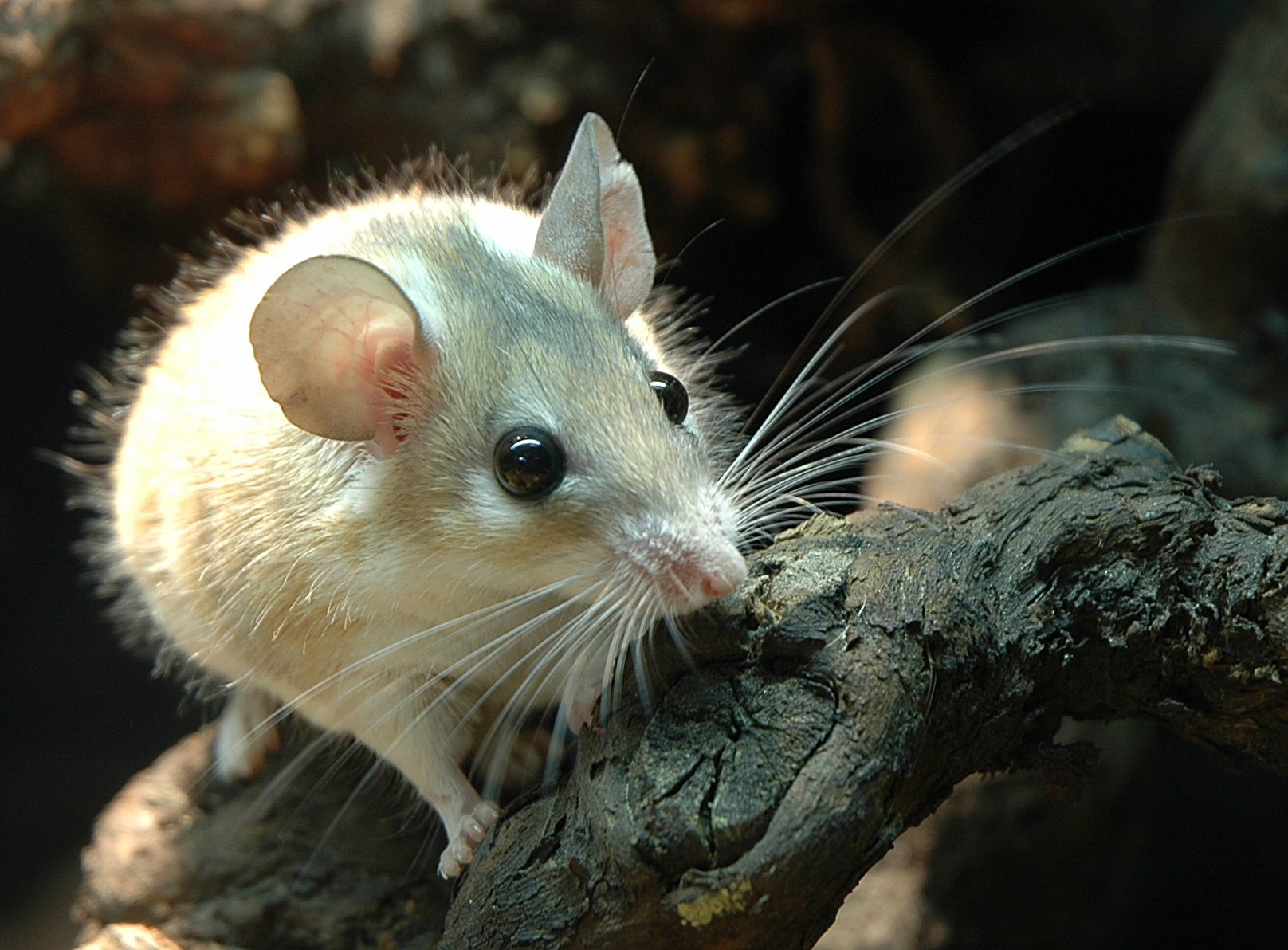
- Eastern spiny mouse (Acomys dimidiatus)

Scientific classification
- Kingdom: Animalia
- Phylum: Chordata
- Class: Mammalia
- Order: Rodentia
- Family: Muridae
- Subfamily: Deomyinae; Thomas, 1888

Genera
- Acomys; Deomys; Lophuromys; Uranomys

= Deomyinae =

Deomyinae Temporal range: Early Pliocene - recent

Subfamily of rodents

The subfamily Deomyinae consists of four genera of mouse-like rodents that were previously placed in the subfamilies Murinae and Dendromurinae. They are sometimes called the Acomyinae, particularly in references that antedate the discovery that the link rat, Deomys ferugineus, is part of the clade. Deomyinae is the older name and therefore has priority over Acomyinae.

Deomyines share no morphological characteristics that can be used to separate them from other muroids, though subtle aspects of the third upper molar have been suggested. This subfamily is united solely on the basis of shared genetic mutations. These conclusions have demonstrated good statistical support using nuclear and mitochondrial DNA, and DNA-DNA hybridization.

Because of the lack of physical characteristics supporting this group, it is very possible that the subfamily as it is currently recognized is subject to enlargement. Many of the genera currently placed in the Murinae or Dendromurinae have not yet been included in a molecular phylogenetic analysis.

All genera are found in Africa, suggesting the deomyines may have originated there. The spiny mice, Acomys spp., are also found in Asia.

Individuals from every genus in the subfamily have been found to possess tail osteoderms, which are rarely seen in mammals.

== Classification ==
The four genera and 54 species included in the Deomyinae are:

- Subfamily Deomyinae
  - Genus Acomys – spiny mice
    - Western Saharan spiny mouse, Acomys airensis
    - Cairo spiny mouse, Acomys cahirinus
    - Chudeau's spiny mouse, Acomys chudeaui
    - Asia Minor spiny mouse, Acomys cilicicus
    - Gray spiny mouse, Acomys cineraceus
    - Eastern spiny mouse, Acomys dimidiatus
    - Fiery spiny mouse, Acomys ignitus
    - Johan's spiny mouse, Acomys johannis
    - Kemp's spiny mouse, Acomys kempi
    - Louise's spiny mouse, Acomys louisae
    - Crete spiny mouse, Acomys minous
    - Mullah spiny mouse, Acomys mullah
    - Muze spiny mouse, Acomys muzei
    - Cyprus spiny mouse, Acomys nesiotes
    - Nguru spiny mouse, Acomys ngurui
    - Percival's spiny mouse, Acomys percivali
    - Golden spiny mouse, Acomys russatus
    - Seurat's spiny mouse, Acomys seurati
    - Southern African spiny mouse, Acomys spinosissimus
    - Cape spiny mouse, Acomys subspinosus
    - Wilson's spiny mouse, Acomys wilsoni
  - Genus Deomys
    - Link rat, Deomys ferrugineus
  - Genus Lophuromys - brush-furred mice
    - Subgenus Kivumys
      - Yellow-bellied brush-furred rat, Lophuromys luteogaster
      - Medium-tailed brush-furred rat, Lophuromys medicaudatus
      - Woosnam's brush-furred rat, Lophuromys woosnami
    - Subgenus Lophuromys
      - Angolan brush-furred rat, Lophuromys angolensis
      - Ansorge's brush-furred rat, Lophuromys ansorgei
      - Gray brush-furred rat, Lophuromys aquilus
      - Short-tailed brush-furred rat, Lophuromys brevicaudus
      - Thomas's Ethiopian brush-furred rat, Lophuromys brunneus
      - Mount Chercher brush-furred rat, Lophuromys chercherensis
      - Ethiopian forest brush-furred rat, Lophuromys chrysopus
      - Dieterlen's brush-furred mouse, Lophuromys dieterleni
      - Dudu's brush-furred rat, Lophuromys dudui
      - Eisentraut's brush-furred rat, Lophuromys eisentrauti
      - Yellow-spotted brush-furred rat, Lophuromys flavopunctatus
      - Hutterer's brush-furred mouse, Lophuromys huttereri
      - Kilonzo's brush furred rat, Lophuromys kilonzoi
      - Lophuromys laticeps
      - Machangu's brush furred rat, Lophuromys machangui
      - Makundi's brush-furred rat, Lophuromys makundii
      - Lophuromys margarettae
      - Black-clawed brush-furred rat, Lophuromys melanonyx
      - North Western Rift brush-furred rat, Lophuromys menageshae
      - Fire-bellied brush-furred rat, Lophuromys nudicaudus
      - Sheko Forest brush-furred rat, Lophuromys pseudosikapusi
      - Rahm's brush-furred rat, Lophuromys rahmi
      - Lophuromys rita
      - Mount Cameroon brush-furred rat, Lophuromys roseveari
      - Sabuni's brush-furred rat, Lophuromys sabunii
      - Rusty-bellied brush-furred rat, Lophuromys sikapusi
      - Lophuromys simensis
      - Stanley's brush-furred rat, Lophuromys stanleyi
      - Verhagen's brush-furred mouse, Lophuromys verhageni
      - Zena's brush-furred rat, Lophuromys zena
  - Genus Uranomys
    - Rudd's mouse, Uranomys ruddi
