= List of murids =

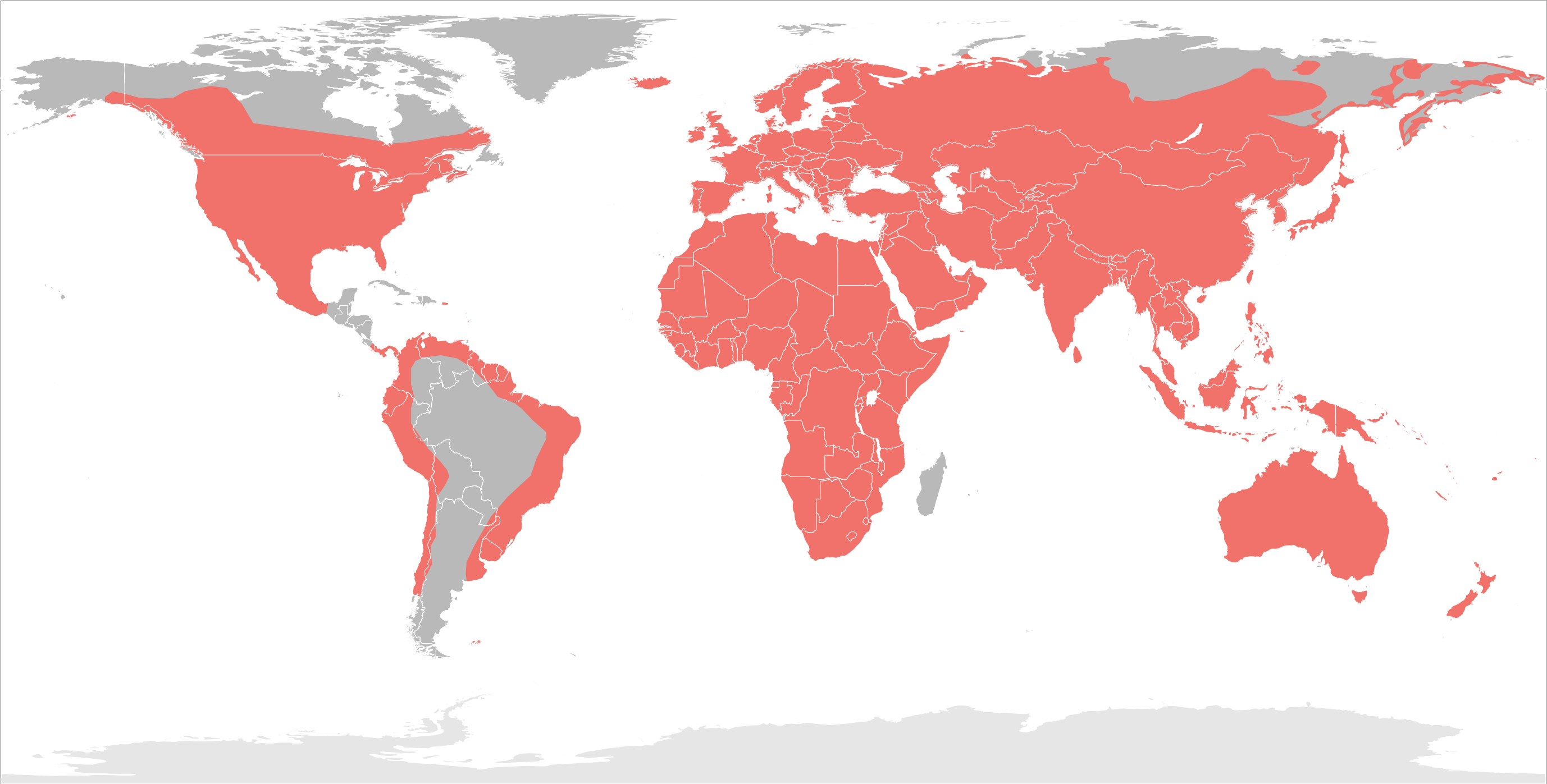
Muridae distribution

Murids (family Muridae) are small rodents classified in the order Rodentia. They include gerbils and many types of mice and rats.

Muridae is divided into five subfamilies:

- For members of the subfamily Deomyinae (spiny mice and brush-furred rats), see List of deomyines
- For members of the subfamily Gerbillinae (gerbils, jirds, and sand rats), see List of gerbillines
- For the sole member of the subfamily Leimacomyinae, see Togo mouse
- For the sole member of the subfamily Lophiomyinae, see Maned rat
- For members of the subfamily Murinae (Old World rats and mice), see List of murines
