= Leucospermum profugum =

Conservation status
- Vulnerable (IUCN 3.1)

Scientific classification
- Kingdom: Plantae
- Clade: Tracheophytes
- Clade: Angiosperms
- Clade: Eudicots
- Order: Proteales
- Family: Proteaceae
- Genus: Leucospermum
- Species: L. profugum

Binomial name
- Leucospermum profugum Rourke, 1970

Species of shrub (Piketberg pincushion)

Leucospermum profugum, the Piketberg pincushion, is a species of evergreen shrub in the family Proteaceae. It is an endangered species, only known from three close locations in the Western Cape province of South Africa. It has hairless and leathery inverted lance-shaped to oblong leaves tipped with mostly three or four teeth and flattened egg-shaped flowerheads of 9–12 cm (3.5–4.7 in) in diameter, that consist of initially yellowish-orange flowers that later change to salmon pink. From the center of the flowers emerge almost straight styles that jointly give the impression of a pincushion. Flower heads can be found between late September and December.

== Description ==
Leucospermum profugum is an evergreen, creeping shrub. It grows up to 8 m (25 ft) in diameter, 4 m (13 ft) across, with an exposed, stern rootstock of 4–12 cm (1.6–4.7 in) thick, from which several unbranched creeping stems extend of 2–4 m (8–16 ft) long, woody and over a considerable length mostly leafless at base, 2–3 cm (¾–1¼ in) thick sometimes covered with same cork, and 4 m across. It grows from a single main stem of up to 10 cm (4 in) thick, and has a smooth, grey bark. The flowering stems often have a bow shape, with the flower heads emerging at a right angle. The soon hairless leaves are inverted lance-shaped to oblong, 3–5½ cm (1.2–2.2 in) long and 6–8 mm (¼–⅓ in) wide, having a rounded or cut-off tip with three or four teeth. At base, it has leafless main branches that trail over the surrounding vegetation and rock. The leaves are usually pointing upwards and often bent somewhat towards the base of the branch.

The flattened egg-shaped flower heads of 9–12 cm (3.6–4.8 in) in diameter are set on a stalk of up to 3–3½ cm (1.2–1.4 in) long, and arranged individually at a richt angle to the stem. The common base of the flowers in the same head is cone-shaped with a pointy tip, 2–2½ cm (0.8–1.0 in) long and 1–1⅓ cm (0.4–0.6 in) across. The bracts that subtend each flower head are lance-shaped with a pointy tip, 5–7 mm (0.20–0.28 in) long, cartilaginous in consistency, and covered with densely matted woolly hairs.

The bract that subtends each flower individually is egg- to heart-shaped, about 11 mm (0.44 in) long and 8–9 mm (0.31–0.35 in) wide, and the upper end very densely set with woolly hairs, with the tip abruptly pointy and 4–5 mm long. The 4-merous perianth is 3½–4 cm (1.4–1.6 in) long, initially yellowish-orange but later change to salmon pink. The lowest, fully merged, part of the perianth, called tube, is about 1½ cm (0.6 in) long, at 1–1½ mm (0.04–0.06 in) narrow and hairless near the base but expanded and widened and minutely powdery higher up, where it is 3½–4 mm (0.14–0.16 in) diameter. It is keeled on the side facing the edge of the head. The upper part (or limbs), which enclosed the pollen presenter in the bud consists of four lobes, each about 4 mm (0.16 in) long and 1½ (0.06 in) wide and carries hard, stiff rust-coloured hairs. From the perianth emerges the style that bents towards the center of the head and tapers towards its tip, is 4½–6¼ cm (1¾–2½ in) long. The thickened part at the tip of the style called pollen-presenter is narrowly egg-shaped or cone-shaped with a pointy tip and about 1 mm (0.04 in) long, with a groove acting as the stigma skewed to the side of the center of the head. The ovary is subtended by four orange, awl-shaped scales of 4–5 mm (0.16–0.20 in) long.

=== Differences with related species ===
Unlike other creeping Leucospermum species, the Piketberg pincushion has longer styles of 4½–6¼ cm, and large, 3–5¼ cm long, quickly hairless, inverted egg- to lance-shaped leaves, with mostly three or four teeth near the tip. The habit of the Piketberg pincushion differs rather strikingly from that of its trailing relatives in that it produces only a few main unbranched stems, of up to 4 m long across the rocks and the surrounding vegetation. These emerge from a woody rootstock that is usually exposed and grows in the cracks between the rocks.

== Taxonomy ==
As far as known, Miss C. Edwards was the first to collect the Piketberg pincushion for science in 1914, and John Patrick Rourke described the Piketberg pincushion in 1970.

The species name profugum is a Latin word meaning "fleeing outward".

L. profugum has been assigned to the section Tumiditubus.

== Distribution, habitat, and ecology ==
The Piketberg pincushion can only be found on the southern slopes of the Piketberg, between Aasvoelkop and Versveld's Pass, at an altitude of 350–750 m (1,150–2,460 ft). The species only occurs in well-drained conditions, like rocky outcrops or small koppies made of Table Mountain Sandstone. It grows alongside low Restionaceae, Diosma vulgaris, Rhus africana, and Leucadendron glaberrimum.

== Conservation ==
The Piketberg pincushion is considered endangered, because only three locations are known where it can be found, within an area of only 29 km^{2} (11 sq mi), and are potentially under threat due to too frequent fires.
