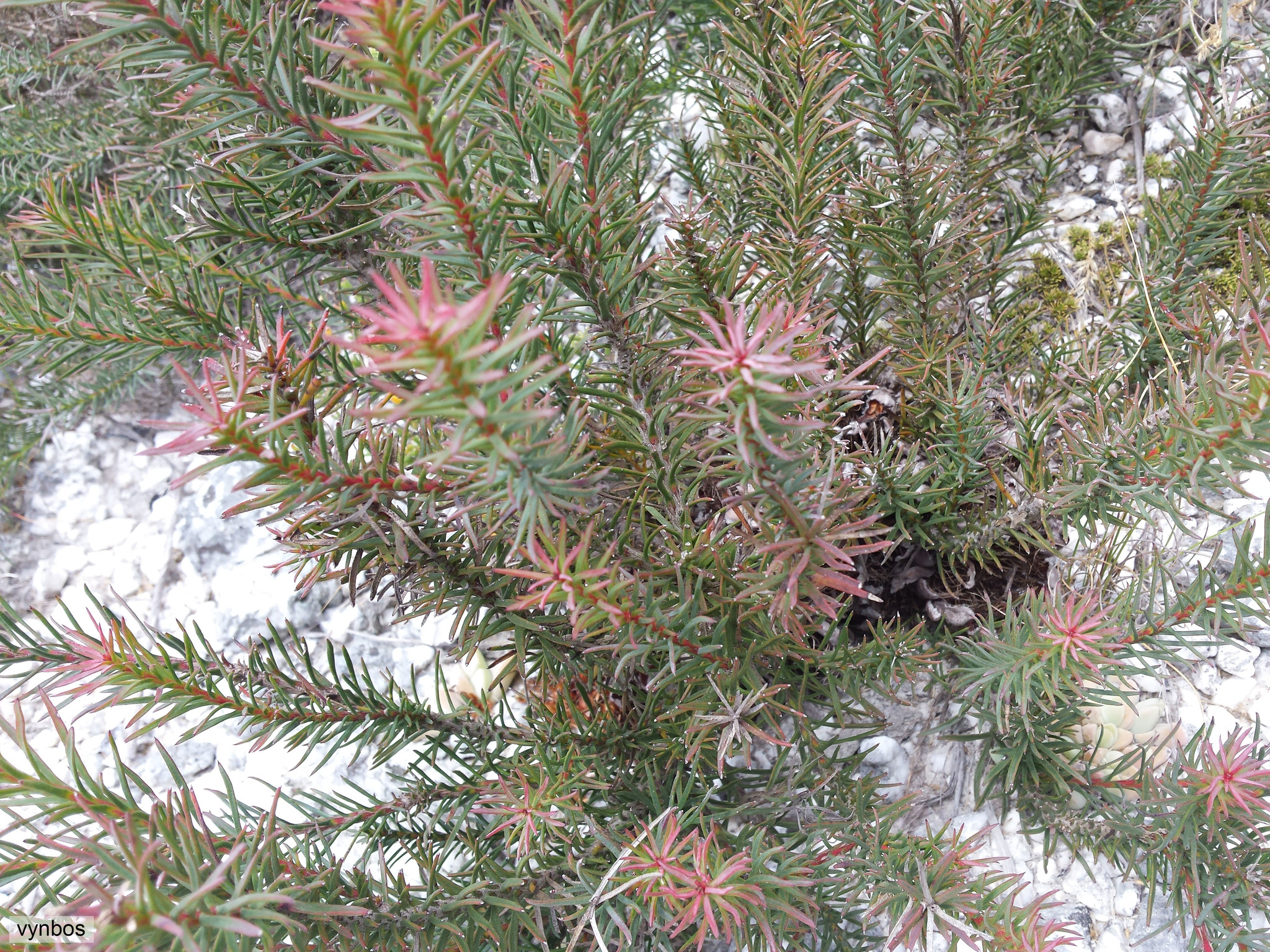

Conservation status
- Endangered (IUCN 3.1)

Scientific classification
- Kingdom: Plantae
- Clade: Tracheophytes
- Clade: Angiosperms
- Clade: Eudicots
- Order: Proteales
- Family: Proteaceae
- Genus: Protea
- Species: P. decurrens

Binomial name
- Protea decurrens E.Phillips

= Protea decurrens =

South African shrub

Protea decurrens, also known as linear-leaf sugarbush, is a shrub of the genus Protea, in the Proteaceae family, which is endemic to the southwestern Cape Region of South Africa. It is a small shrub with a thick underground rootstock, this structure throwing up numerous leafy branches, upon the base of which clusters of flower heads may appear close to the ground. It is pollinated by rodents and grows in low-altitude fynbos or renosterveld.

In the Afrikaans language it is known as the Overbergsesuikerbos.

== Taxonomy ==
It was first described as a new species by Edwin Percy Phillips in 1910, but the plant was known long before Phillips. In the Prodromus of 1856, under the name Protea humilis, Carl Meissner is thought to have actually partially described this species (i.e. a synonym pro parte), based on the herbarium specimen he was using, which had recently been collected by the German explorer Karl Ludwig Philipp Zeyher.

P. humiflora has a confused history. The plant had first been described by Henry Cranke Andrews using the spelling P. humiflora in his magazine The Botanists' Repository. In describing the plant, he made use of a living specimen blooming at the estate of the Protea collector George Hibbert, yet his illustration is somewhat confused in arrangement of the flower heads on the plant, showing a plant with the heads clustered on the stem near the ground and purplish in colour more like P. decurrens, where as the herbarium specimens of the same plant show this not to be the case. The seeds and specimens had first been collected by Francis Masson and one Drummond, and according to Stapf the Drummond specimen was actually P. decurrens. Spelled as P. humilis, it was described in Robert Brown's 1810 work in On the Proteaceae of Jussieu, with Andrews' older name designated a synonym and only the Masson specimen mentioned with regards to type. According to Meissner, by the mid-19th century, in horticultural collectors' circles, there were plants -possibly two or more species- which were grown, traded and sold under the name P. humifusa on the European continent, and he also reports Carl Ludwig Willdenow used the spelling P. humiflorens. Meissner in 1856 advocated the use of Brown's name, despite it being a homotypic synonym, a decision opposed by Phillips in 1910 and Stapf in 1912. Thus by the 1910s a P. humiflora was known to exist, and had been recollected in South Africa by William John Burchell and later Rudolf Marloth around the turn of the previous century.

=== Types ===
Stapf designated the holotype of this species to be the afore-mentioned P. humiflora specimen collected by Drummond in the 18th century; it is without a precise collection locale, and is likely lost. In the 19th century the species was collected again by Zeyher, and later the South African Harry Bolus, both in the mountains in the area of Swellendam. Zeyher gives two, possibly three, locations near Swellendam, and he apparently also collected it somewhere along the banks of a place he called the 'Keurboom Rivier', which according to Phillips was in what in his time was the Knysna Division. The original herbarium sheet has all of these localities on the label of his specimen 3676. This effectively might mean that Zeyher 3676 is composed of a number of different plants from different localities (a type series), thus in 1972 the South African botanist John Patrick Rourke, considering the lack of the Drummond specimen, designated the Zeyher specimen sheet extant at the Kew Herbarium as a syntype.

=== Etymology ===
The species epithet refers to its decurrent leaves.

== Description ==
Protea decurrens grows up to 50 cm in diameter and 60 cm in height. It is suffrutescent; the main trunk of the plant is found burrowing below the ground like a thick root, sending up a number of branches which can grow from prostrate on the ground to ascending. The plant flowers from the base of these branches at ground level.

The linear to acicular-shaped leaves are 1.4mm in width, but 1.25–2.25 inches (3.2–5.7 cm) in length. The leaves are glabrous, end in a point, and are shortly decurrent: their bases partially clasp the stem.

It blooms in the winter, from July to August, sometimes extending into October. The inflorescences, or more specifically pseudanthia (also called 'flower heads'), are lateral, budding from the sides of the stems as opposed to at their tops, and are solitary or clustered in often large groups. Usually a plant with multiple of such clusters will have only one of these in flower, with the other clusters still budding. The inflorescence is 1.5 inches (3.8 cm) long, and around .5 inches (1.3 cm) in diameter. When young they are obovoid and obtuse in shape. The flower head contracts toward the base, this constricted part is a peduncle up to 1 centimetre (0.39 in) long, formed of scaly stipes. The involucral bracts are arranged in a series of nine to ten rows, and are ciliate (fringed with a hairs like an eyelash). These bracts are very densely covered in whitish hairs, tomentose to silky-pubescent in texture. The outer bracts are ovate and obtuse in shape, the inner bracts are oblong or spoon-shaped oblong, longer than the actual flowers, and have villous (shaggy) hairs at their ends. It is monoecious, both sexes occur in each flower. The petals and sepals of the flowers are fused into a glabrous, 19mm long perianth-sheath. This sheath is dilated from the middle downwards, having three keels and seven veins on this lower half, and thinly membranous above. The sheath has a lip which is 4.2mm long. The lip is three-toothed at the top, with each tooth almost equal in length, 0.5mm. The lip is oblong and glabrous except for the tips of the teeth, which are covered in ephemeral, fleeting, easily rubbed-off, villous hairs. All of the stamens are fertile. The filament is 0.35mm long and swollen. The anthers are linear and 3.2mm long. The apical glands are 0.26 mm in length and ovate in shape. The ovary is 4.2 mm long and covered in long, reddish-brown hairs. The style is slender, 21.2mm long, strongly curved to sickle-shaped, becoming subulate upwards, and arising from a keeled, widened and bulbously thickened base. The stigma is 3.2mm long, subulate, with an obtuse end, and obscurely bent at the junction where it joins the style.

The seeds are stored in the many woody fruit studding the dried, old, fire-resistant inflorescence, and after these capsules eventually open after wildfires a few years later, are dispersed by means of the wind.

=== Similar species ===
In his original 1910 description, Phillips found this species most similar to P. humiflora, being distinguished by its narrow, decurrent leaves, and P. acerosa, from which it differs in the shape of its calyx.

== Distribution ==
Protea decurrens is endemic to the Western Cape province of South Africa. The plant is found from Shaw's Pass (from Hermanus through the Kleinrivier Mountains to Caledon) to the Langeberg, and on the Potberg. Within this region it also grows near the town of Riversdale along the Correnterivier, along the Keurboomsrivier, and around the towns of Riversdale and Swellendam. It is known from twenty-five populations, these are fragmented (i.e. bits of once larger populations). Although its extent of occurrence is much larger, its area of occupancy is only 180–184 km².

== Ecology ==
Pollination occurs through visits to the flower heads by species of rats and mice. Periodic wildfires destroy the adult plants, but the seeds can survive such an event. It is a short-lived re-seeder with a generation lasting 15 to 20 years.

The plant grows in a fynbos or renosterveld. It found growing in substrates of silcrete or ferricrete gravel, at altitudes of 150 to 700 metres.

== Conservation ==
In the 1990s this was considered a rather unknown species, being cryptic and easily overlooked, and it was believed not to be threatened and probably more common, but at the same time possibly endangered with extinction. Nonetheless, it has a restricted range, and in 1996 its conservation status was assessed as 'vulnerable' by the South African National Biodiversity Institute (SANBI). In 2009 this was upgraded to 'endangered', but as of 2019 it is considered 'near threatened' by SANBI, with a population decreasing in numbers. Near threatened is because SANBI has inferred that the total population will be reduced in 2049 by 21-27%, based on the recent rate of habitat loss. Population decline is caused by habitat loss to afforestation, agriculture, habitat degradation by Australian invasive plants of the genera Hakea and Acacia, overgrazing by livestock, too frequent wildfires, as well as unexplained reasons in some cases. Too frequent fires do not give the plants time to mature and set seed. Much of the more hilly habitat has been destroyed to plant trees, and in the lowlands habitat is eyed for production of wheat; both industries saw a slight expansion in Riversdale, Swellendam and Shaw's Pass in the 2010s. Some 61% of the original habitat has been irreversibly altered. Only two populations are located within protected areas.

Despite this all, in 2019 SANBI continued to caution that "this species is probably more common in suitable habitat than is currently known", it is simply difficult to find and understudied. The population is estimated to be large.
