= Leucadendron glaberrimum subsp. glaberrimum =

Conservation status
- Least Concern (IUCN 3.1)

Scientific classification
- Kingdom: Plantae
- Clade: Tracheophytes
- Clade: Angiosperms
- Clade: Eudicots
- Order: Proteales
- Family: Proteaceae
- Genus: Leucadendron
- Species: L. glaberrimum (Schltr.) Compton
- Subspecies: L. g. subsp. glaberrimum

Trinomial name
- Leucadendron glaberrimum subsp. glaberrimum

Synonyms
- Leucospermum glaberrimum Schltr.

Subspecies of plant

Leucadendron glaberrimum subsp. glaberrimum, the common oily conebush, is a flowering shrub and subspecies of Leucadendron glaberrimum, belonging to the genus Leucadendron and forming part of the fynbos biome. The species is endemic to the Western Cape where it occurs in the Cederberg, Kouebokkeveld Mountains, Skurweberge and Hex River Mountains.

The shrub dies after burning but the seeds survive. It flowers from August to October. The seeds are stored in a spiny on the female plant and only fall to the ground two months after the flower has ripened. The seeds may be collected by the Cape spiny mouse. The plant is unisexual and there are separate plants with male and female flowers and is pollinated by small beetles. The plant grows up to 1.3 m (4 ft) tall and grows in mountainous, steep sandy or rocky slopes at altitudes of 900–1,700 m (2,953–5,577 ft).
