= Thomas's Ethiopian brush-furred rat =

Scientific classification
- Kingdom: Animalia
- Phylum: Chordata
- Class: Mammalia
- Order: Rodentia
- Family: Muridae
- Genus: Lophuromys
- Species: L. brunneus

Binomial name
- Lophuromys brunneus Thomas, 1906

Synonyms
- Lophuromys simensis Osgood, 1936; Lophuromys aquilus brunneus Thomas, 1906

Species of rodent

Thomas's Ethiopian brush-furred rat (Lophuromys brunneus), also called the brown brush-furred rat or the brown brush-furred mouse, is a species of brush-furred mouse from Southern Ethiopia.

== Description ==
The holotype had a body 125 millimetres (4.9 in) long and a tail 80 millimetres (3.1 in) long. The body is a pale brown with a pale brown or clay-colored belly.

== Range and habitat ==
L. brunneus is endemic to the highlands of Southern Ethiopia, from the Semien Mountains to Manno-Jimma. The type locality is around the Omo River.

== History ==
It was originally described as a subspecies of Lophuromys aquilus (L. aquilus brunneus) in 1906 by Oldfield Thomas, from a specimen collected 13 May 1905. It was reclassified as a subspecies of Lophuromys flavopunctatus in 1936 as a synonym to subspecies L. flavopunctatus zaphiri. In 2002, it was elevated to species status.

== Phylogeny ==
The species is closely related to the Ethiopian forest brush-furred rat (Lophuromys chrysopus). It is believed to have interbred with L. flavopunctatus.
