= Leucadendron glaberrimum subsp. erubescens =

Conservation status
- Least Concern (IUCN 3.1)

Scientific classification
- Kingdom: Plantae
- Clade: Embryophytes
- Clade: Tracheophytes
- Clade: Spermatophytes
- Clade: Angiosperms
- Clade: Eudicots
- Order: Proteales
- Family: Proteaceae
- Genus: Leucadendron
- Species: L. glaberrimum
- Subspecies: L. g. subsp. erubescens

Trinomial name
- Leucadendron glaberrimum subsp. erubescens I.Williams

Subspecies of plant

Leucadendron glaberrimum subsp. erubescens, the red oily conebush, is a flowering shrub and subspecies of Leucadendron glaberrimum, belonging to the genus Leucadendron and forming part of the fynbos biome. The species is endemic to the Western Cape where it occurs in the Olifants River Mountains, Kouebokkeveld Mountains, Groot Winterhoek, Skurweberge and Piketberg.

The shrub grows up to 80 cm tall and dies after burning but the seeds survive. The shrub flowers from August to September. The seeds are stored in a spiny on the female plant and only fall to the ground two months after the flower has ripened. The seeds are collected by rodents. The plant is unisexual and there are separate plants with male and female flowers that are pollinated by small beetles. The plant grows in mountainous, steep sandy or rocky slopes at altitudes of 300–1,000 m (984–3,281 ft).
