= Lophuromys simensis =

Conservation status
- Least Concern (IUCN 3.1)

Scientific classification
- Kingdom: Animalia
- Phylum: Chordata
- Class: Mammalia
- Order: Rodentia
- Family: Muridae
- Genus: Lophuromys
- Species: L. simensis

Binomial name
- Lophuromys simensis Osgood, 1936

Species of brush-furred mouse

Lophuromys simensis, commonly known as the short-tailed brush-furred rat or Simien brush-furred rat, is a species of brush-furred mouse. It was described by Osgood in 1936 under the name Lophuromys flavopunctus simensis. It has been considered a likely synonym of Lophuromys brunneus (Thomas, 1906).

L. simensis is endemic to Ethiopia, where it has been observed in the forests and grasslands, ranging in elevation from 1,800m to over 3,000m. It has been found in the Simien Mountains National Park, and gains its name from the Simien Mountains where it was first observed.

Osgood described L. simensis as being similar in color to L. flavopunctatus and L. zaphiri.

The species primarily consumes invertebrates, though it has a varied diet that changes depending on the season. In the dry season, they eat more leaves, stems, and seeds, whereas they eat more invertebrates in the wet season.
