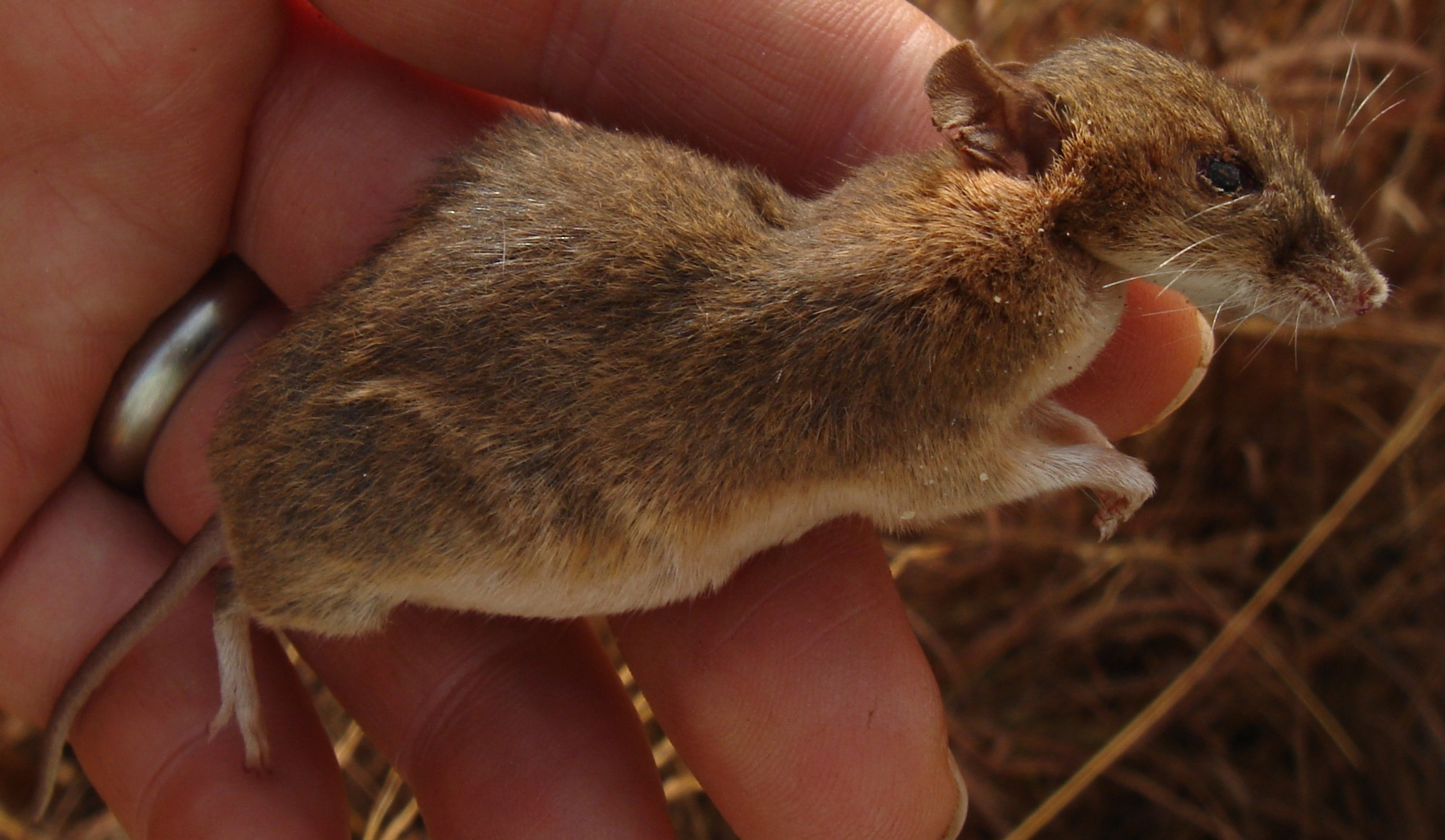

Conservation status
- Least Concern (IUCN 3.1)

Scientific classification
- Kingdom: Animalia
- Phylum: Chordata
- Class: Mammalia
- Order: Rodentia
- Family: Muridae
- Subfamily: Deomyinae
- Genus: Uranomys; Dollman, 1909
- Species: U. ruddi

Binomial name
- Uranomys ruddi Dollman, 1909

= Rudd's mouse =

Species of rodent

Rudd's mouse or the white-bellied brush-furred rat (Uranomys ruddi) is the only species in the genus Uranomys. This animal is closely related to the spiny mice, brush-furred mice, and the link rat.

== Description ==
Head and body sizes range from 8.4 to 13.4 cm long. Tail length is 5.3-7.9 cm. Weight is 41-53 g. The hairs on the back of this species are stiff like the brush-furred mice, but not spiny as in Acomys. The belly is white and feet are covered in white hairs. Incisors project anteriorly.

== Natural history ==
The animal is known across a wide range in Africa, but is never common. They are usually taken in savannah habitat. Rudd's mouse is thought to be nocturnal. It feeds predominantly on insects.
