= Link rat =

Conservation status
- Least Concern (IUCN 3.1)

Scientific classification
- Kingdom: Animalia
- Phylum: Chordata
- Class: Mammalia
- Order: Rodentia
- Family: Muridae
- Genus: Deomys; Thomas, 1888
- Species: D. ferrugineus

Binomial name
- Deomys ferrugineus Thomas, 1888

Species of rodent

The link rat (Deomys ferrugineus) is a species of rodent in the family Muridae. It is also known by the common name Congo forest mouse. It is native to central Africa.

It is 12–14.5 cm long with a 15–21 cm tail. It weighs 40–70 g. It has long legs and a pointed, narrow head, surmounted by enormous ears. It has a very long, bicoloured tail. The back and forehead are rich orange and brown and the underside is white. The rump hairs are stiff.

The link rat is nocturnal and crepuscular. It prefers seasonally flooded forest floors between Cameroon and the Victoria Nile. It has a widespread but scattered distribution and is rarely common. It feeds mainly on insects, crustaceans, slugs and some fallen fruits, notably palm-nut husks.

The link rat has traditionally been placed as a member of the subfamily Dendromurinae along with the African climbing mice, but has been demonstrated to be more closely related to the spiny mice on the basis of molecular data. A new subfamily (Deomyinae) was created which contains this species plus the spiny mice (Acomys), the brush furred mice (Lophuromys), and Rudd's mouse (Uranomys). This group is supported by several recent phylogenetic studies.
