= North Western Rift brush-furred rat =

Conservation status
- Data Deficient (IUCN 3.1)

Scientific classification
- Kingdom: Animalia
- Phylum: Chordata
- Class: Mammalia
- Order: Rodentia
- Family: Muridae
- Genus: Lophuromys
- Species: L. menageshae

Binomial name
- Lophuromys menageshae Lavrenchenko, W. Verheyen, E. Verheyen, Hulselmans & Leirs, 2007

Species of rodent

The North Western Rift brush-furred rat (Lophuromys menageshae) is a species of brush-furred mouse found in Ethiopia.
