= Elephant fish =

Elephant fish may refer to:

Fish

- Callorhinchidae, a family of marine fish also known as elephant sharks or plough-nose chimaeras
- Mormyridae, a family of African freshwater fish that sometimes are kept in aquariums

Other

- Gajamina, an elephant-fish mythical figure used in funeral ceremonies in Bali, Indonesia
