= Stanley's brush-furred rat =

Conservation status
- Data Deficient (IUCN 3.1)

Scientific classification
- Kingdom: Animalia
- Phylum: Chordata
- Class: Mammalia
- Order: Rodentia
- Family: Muridae
- Genus: Lophuromys
- Species: L. stanleyi

Binomial name
- Lophuromys stanleyi W. Verheyen, Hulselmans, Dierckx, Mulungu, Leirs, Corti & E. Verheyen, 2007
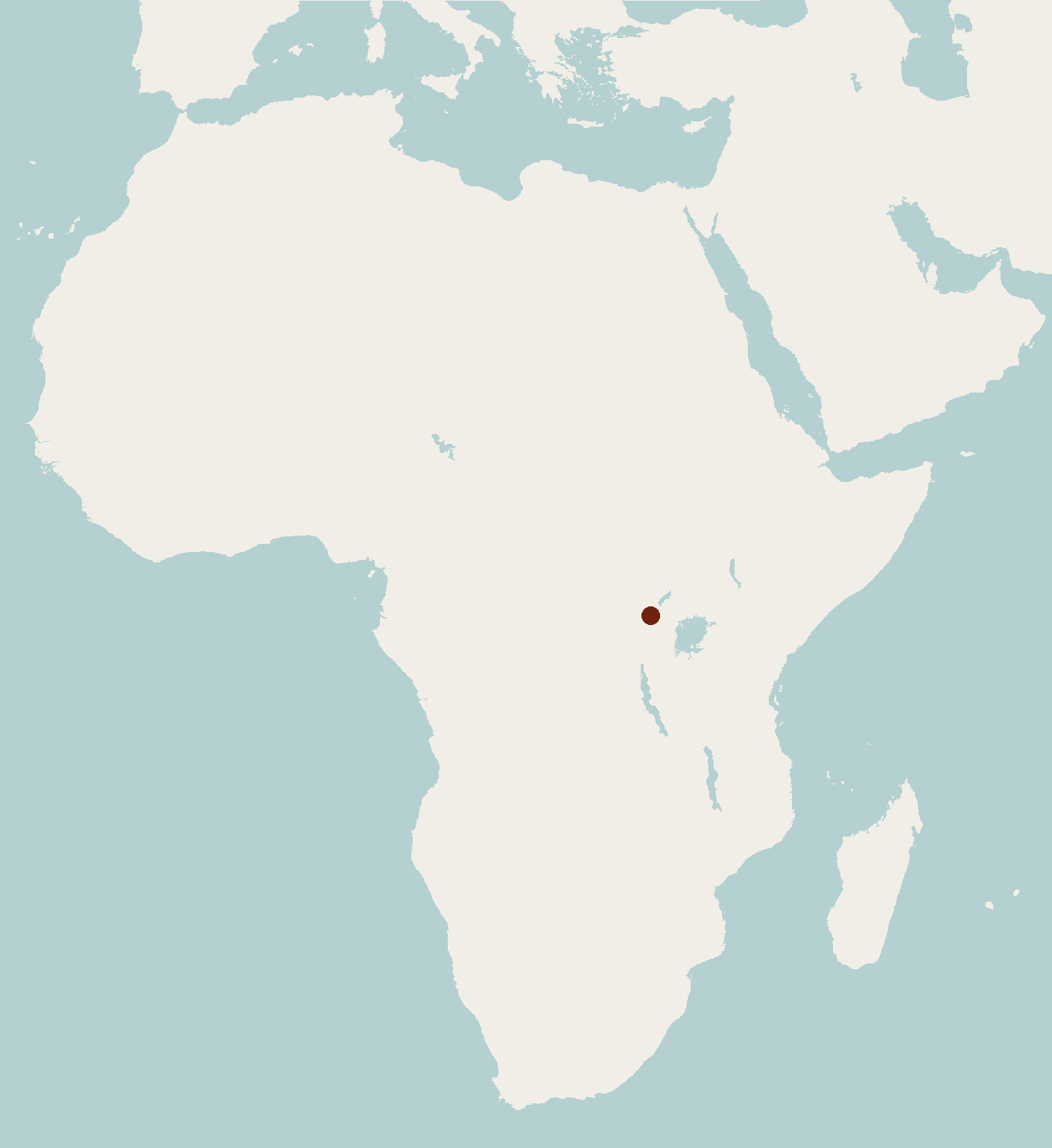
- Distribution

Species of rodent

Stanley's brush-furred rat (Lophuromys stanleyi) is a species of brush-furred mouse found in Uganda and the Democratic Republic of Congo.

The rodents of the genus Lophuromys tend to have stiff hairs which is why they are often called "brush-furred". The species Lophuromys stanleyi was first described in 2007 along with four new Lophuromys species. These new species were characterized based on craniometric measurements and cytochrome b sequences of the specimens. The population of the species is currently unknown. A study of rodent species composition measuring relative abundance in the Mabira Central Forest Reserve, of Uganda found that Lophuromys stanleyi was the most abundant species of the sample. It is also noted that they live in the protected Rwenzori Mountains National Park.
