= Ethiopian forest brush-furred rat =

Conservation status
- Least Concern (IUCN 3.1)

Scientific classification
- Kingdom: Animalia
- Phylum: Chordata
- Class: Mammalia
- Order: Rodentia
- Family: Muridae
- Genus: Lophuromys
- Species: L. chrysopus

Binomial name
- Lophuromys chrysopus Osgood, 1936

Species of rodent

The Ethiopian forest brush-furred rat or golden-footed brush-furred rat (Lophuromys chrysopus), is a species of rodent in the family Muridae. It is endemic to Ethiopia where its natural habitat is subtropical or tropical moist montane forests. It is threatened by habitat loss.

== Description ==
This is a small rat with a head-and-body length of about 115 mm (4.5 in) and a tail of about 80 mm (3.1 in). The blackish-brown dorsal fur is long, dense and somewhat stiff, each individual hair having a reddish-brown base, a broad black band, a narrower yellowish band and a black tip. The underparts are creamy-grey with dark speckles. The fore-feet have blackish hairs on top while those on the hind feet are greyish-red, the toes being black and the claws pale. The tail is bicoloured, the upper surface being clad with dark scales and blackish hairs, and the underside with pale scales and grey hairs with white tips. There is a difference in colour between populations on either side of the Great Rift Valley; those to the east have a more intense, reddish-brown dorsal surface and yellower underparts. The chromosome number is 2n = 54 which distinguishes it from the short-tailed brush-furred rat (Lophuromys brevicaudus) where it is 2n = 68.

== Distribution and habitat ==
The species is endemic to Ethiopia where there are two separate populations, separated by the Great Rift Valley. Its habitat is moist evergreen rainforest on the mountainsides and plateaus at altitudes ranging from 1,200 to 2,760 m (3,900 to 9,100 ft).

== Status ==
The Ethiopian forest brush-furred rat is one of the commonest rodents in the mountain forests of Ethiopia, only exceeded in total number by the Ethiopian white-footed mouse, which inhabits shrubland as well as forest. It lives in the Bale Mountains National Park where it is protected, but is elsewhere mainly threatened by the continual loss of forest cover. The International Union for Conservation of Nature has assessed its conservation status as of "least concern".
