= Dudu's brush-furred rat =

Scientific classification
- Kingdom: Animalia
- Phylum: Chordata
- Class: Mammalia
- Order: Rodentia
- Family: Muridae
- Genus: Lophuromys
- Species: L. dudui

Binomial name
- Lophuromys dudui E. Verheyen, Hulselmans, Dierckx & W. Verheyen, 2002

Species of rodent

Dudu's brush-furred rat (Lophuromys dudui) is a rodent belonging to the genus Lophuromys. It is native to the northeast of the Democratic Republic of Congo, from Kisangani to the eastern mountains of Garamba, Blukwa and Djugu to Irangi.

It has a short tail and is distinguished by its small skull, short ears and short hindquarters. It was split from the species L. flavopunctatus in 2002.
