= Zena's brush-furred rat =

Conservation status
- Data Deficient (IUCN 3.1)

Scientific classification
- Kingdom: Animalia
- Phylum: Chordata
- Class: Mammalia
- Order: Rodentia
- Family: Muridae
- Genus: Lophuromys
- Species: L. zena

Binomial name
- Lophuromys zena Dollman, 1909

Species of rodent

According to UniProt, Zena's brush-furred rat (Lophuromys zena) is a species of rat. However, the IUCN lists this as a synonym for Lophuromys flavopunctatus (yellow-spotted brush-furred rat).
