= Machangu's brush furred rat =

Conservation status
- Data Deficient (IUCN 3.1)

Scientific classification
- Kingdom: Animalia
- Phylum: Chordata
- Class: Mammalia
- Order: Rodentia
- Family: Muridae
- Genus: Lophuromys
- Species: L. machangui

Binomial name
- Lophuromys machangui W. Verheyen, Hulselmans, Dierckx, Mulungu, Leirs, Corti & E. Verheyen, 2007

Species of rodent

Machangu's brush furred rat (Lophuromys machangui) is a species of rodent in the family Muridae. It has been recorded from the Tanzania, Zambia, Malawi, and Mozambique.
