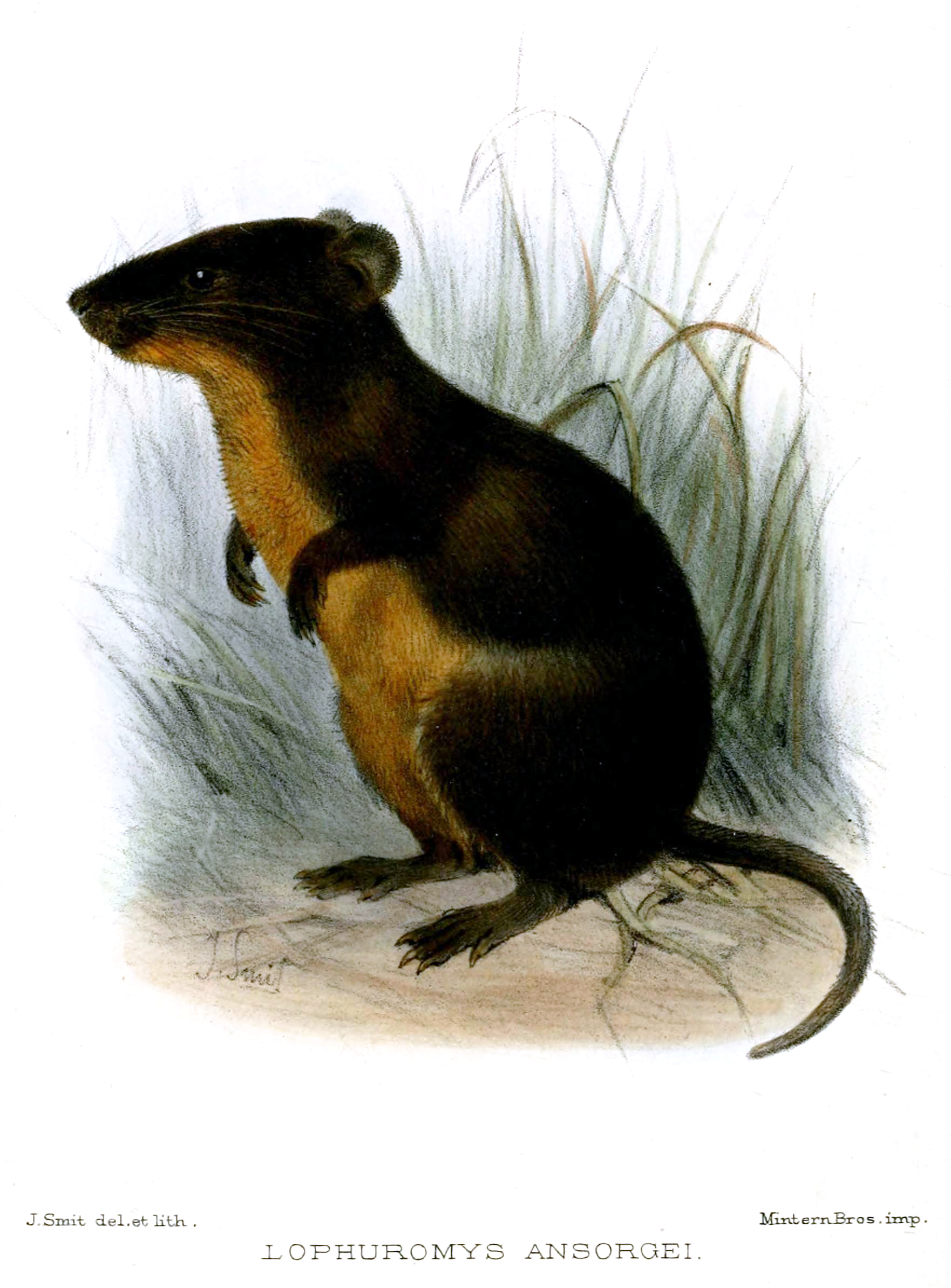

Scientific classification
- Kingdom: Animalia
- Phylum: Chordata
- Class: Mammalia
- Order: Rodentia
- Family: Muridae
- Genus: Lophuromys
- Species: L. ansorgei

Binomial name
- Lophuromys ansorgei de Winton, 1896

Synonyms
- Lophuromys major O. Thomas & Wroughton, 1907; Lophuromys pyrrhus Heller, 1911; Lophuromys sikapusi manteufeli Matschie, 1911; Lophuromys sikapusi ansorgei Osgood, 1936; Lophuromys sikapusi pyrrhus G. M. Allen, 1939

= Ansorge's brush-furred rat =

Species of rodent

Ansorge's brush-furred rat (Lophuromys ansorgei) is a species of rodent in the family Muridae. It was identified in 1896 by William Edward de Winton as L. ansorgei. However, it was widely regarded as L. sikapusi until 2000, when Walter Verheyen, Theo Dierckx, and Jan Hulselmans published a study to the Bulletin of the Royal Belgian Institute of Natural Sciences treating it as a distinct species.

== Distribution ==
The distribution of the species is not fully known. According to the study by W. Verheyen et al., the species is found in West Africa from the lower reaches of the Congo River in Eastern Democratic Republic of the Congo and in East Africa from Uganda through Western Kenya to Northern Tanzania. However it remains to be seen whether L. ansorgei extends from East Africa along the northern and southern rim of the Congolese Central Forest Block to the lower reaches of the Congo River, or the range along the lower Congo is a historical range of the species.

== Taxonomy ==
The species was first identified as L. ansorgei in Mumias, Nyanza Province in 1896. It is usually included in L. sikapusi, but W. Verheyen et al. consider it as a distinct species in their study.
