= Kilonzo's brush furred rat =

Conservation status
- Least Concern (IUCN 3.1)

Scientific classification
- Kingdom: Animalia
- Phylum: Chordata
- Class: Mammalia
- Order: Rodentia
- Family: Muridae
- Genus: Lophuromys
- Species: L. kilonzoi

Binomial name
- Lophuromys kilonzoi W. Verheyen, Hulselmans, Dierckx, Mulungu, Leirs, Corti & E. Verheyen, 2007

Species of rodent

Kilonzo's brush furred rat (Lophuromys kilonzoi) is a species of rodent in the family Muridae. It has been recorded from Tanzania.
