= Leucadendron glaberrimum =

Conservation status
- Least Concern (IUCN 3.1)

Scientific classification
- Kingdom: Plantae
- Clade: Tracheophytes
- Clade: Angiosperms
- Clade: Eudicots
- Order: Proteales
- Family: Proteaceae
- Genus: Leucadendron
- Species: L. glaberrimum

Binomial name
- Leucadendron glaberrimum (Schlechter) Compton

Species of plant

Leucadendron glaberrimum, the oily conebush, is a species of evergreen shrub in the family Proteaceae. It is endemic to the Western Cape province of South Africa and forms a distinct part of the region's montane fynbos vegetation.

== Subspecies ==
There are two subspecies recognized under L. glaberrimum.

- Leucadendron glaberrimum subp. erubescens
- Leucadendron glaberrimum subp. glaberrimum
