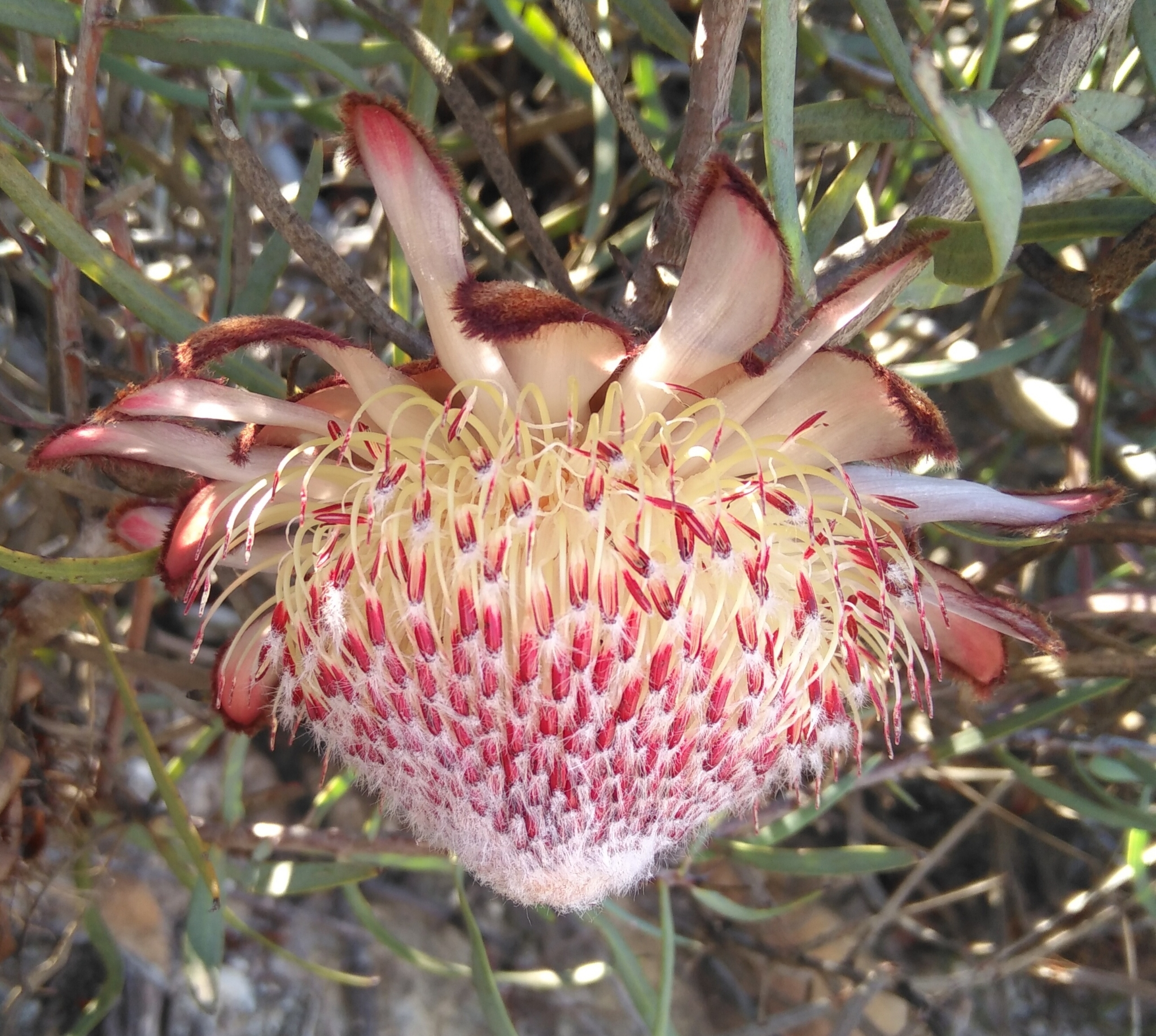

Conservation status
- Least Concern (IUCN 3.1)

Scientific classification
- Kingdom: Plantae
- Clade: Tracheophytes
- Clade: Angiosperms
- Clade: Eudicots
- Order: Proteales
- Family: Proteaceae
- Genus: Protea
- Species: P. humiflora

Binomial name
- Protea humiflora Andrews

= Protea humiflora =

Species of plant

Protea humiflora, the patentleaf sugarbush, is a flower-bearing shrub belonging to the Protea genus. The plant is endemic to South Africa and occurs from the Du Toitskloof Mountains to the Langeberg and Waboomsberg. The plant grows to 2 m in diameter and flowers from July to September with its peak in August.

Fire destroys the plant but the seeds survive. The seeds are stored in a shell and spread by the wind. The plant is unisexual. Pollination takes place through the action of rats and mice. The plant grows on dry slopes of Karoo fynbos at altitudes of 450 - 1 200 m.
