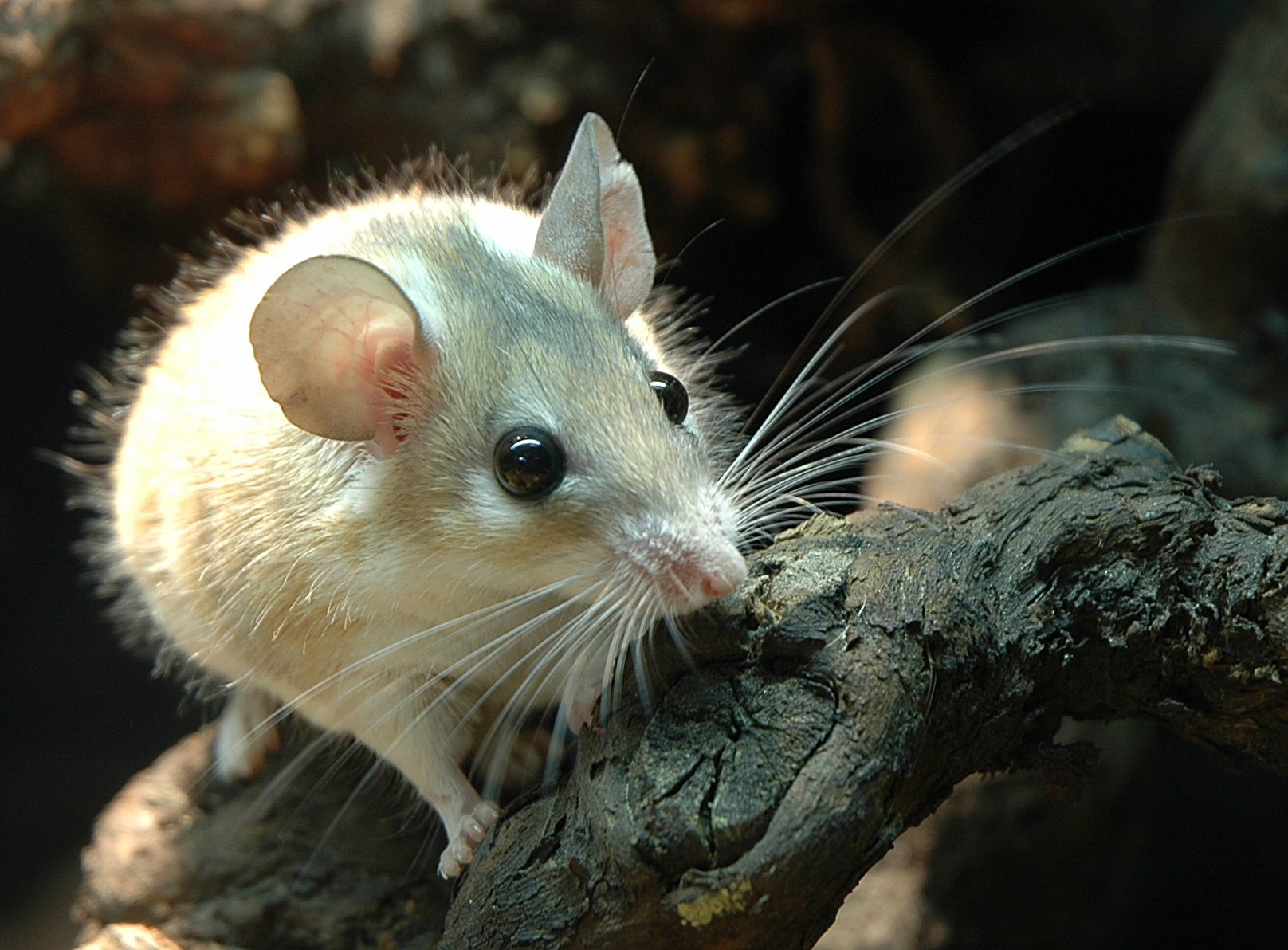

Conservation status
- Least Concern (IUCN 3.1)

Scientific classification
- Kingdom: Animalia
- Phylum: Chordata
- Class: Mammalia
- Order: Rodentia
- Family: Muridae
- Genus: Acomys
- Species: A. dimidiatus

Binomial name
- Acomys dimidiatus (Cretzschmar, 1826)

Synonyms
- Acomys cahirinus dimidiatus Acomys flavidus Mus dimidiatus

= Eastern spiny mouse =

Species of rodent

The eastern spiny mouse or Arabian spiny mouse (Acomys dimidiatus) is a species of rodent in the family Muridae. They have a wide range, having been found in Middle Eastern deserts, as well as being prevalent in riverine forests in Africa. This is the only species of spiny mouse which may have black coloration. Their diet is similar to other species of spiny mouse, consisting mostly of seeds.

== Description ==
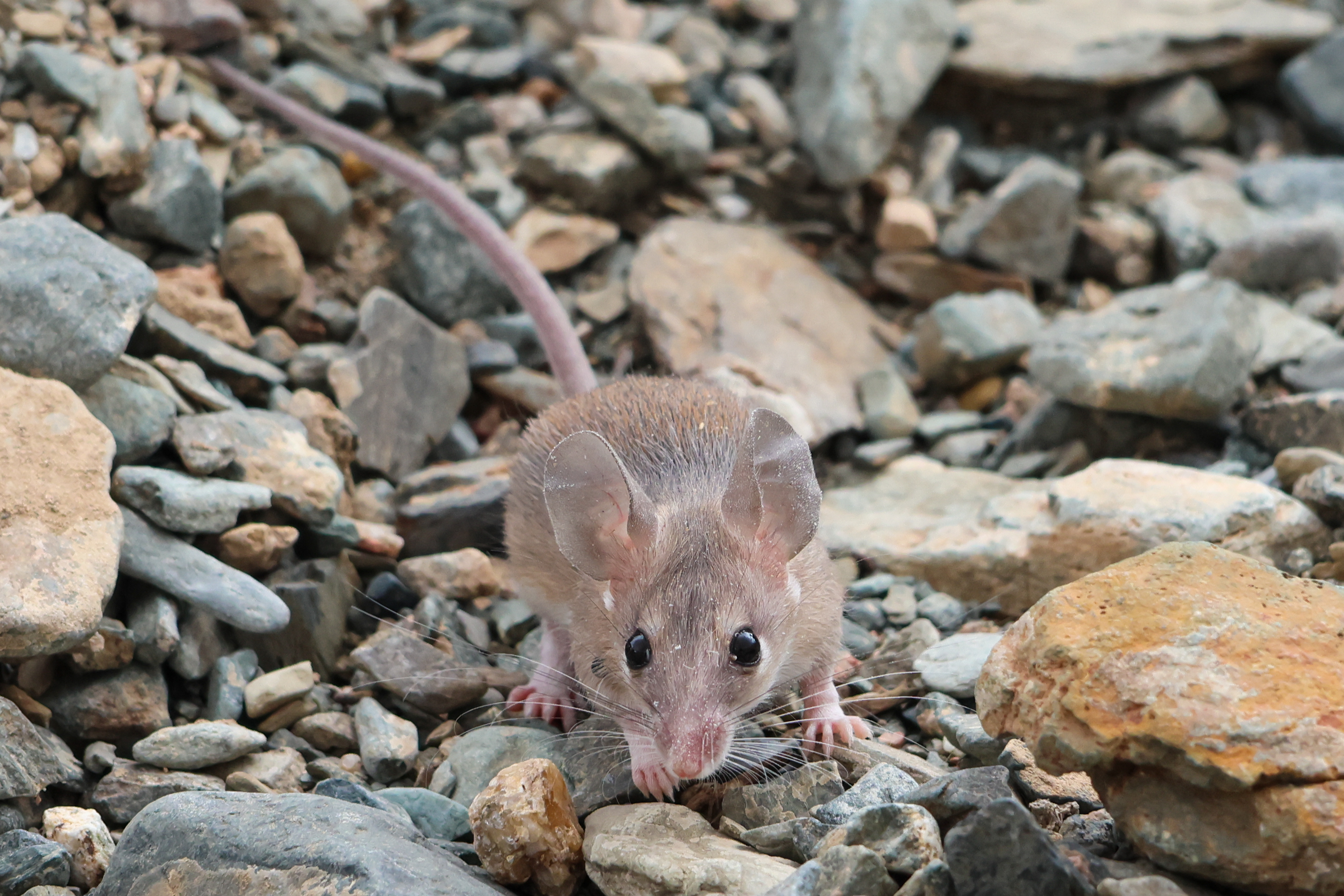
Arabian spiny mouse from eastern Saudi Arabia

Arabian spiny mouse with Eyeshine in Saudi Arabia

The eastern spiny mouse is a small rodent with a head-and-body length of up to 17.5 cm (7 in) and a tail of up to 12.5 cm (5 in), and a maximum weight of about 90 g (3.2 oz). The fur feels coarse when rubbed against the lie of the hairs, each individual hair being dark tan with a greyish tip. The tail appears naked but is in fact clad with short bristles.

== Distribution ==
This mouse has a wide distribution in the Middle East, its range extending from the Sinai Peninsula, through Lebanon, Syria, Jordan and Israel, to the Arabian Peninsula, southern Iraq, southern Iran and southern Pakistan. It occurs in semi-arid or arid regions, in dry forests, scrubby and rocky areas at altitudes of up to 1,200 m (3,900 ft). It can be present in agricultural land and sometimes invades houses.

== Ecology ==
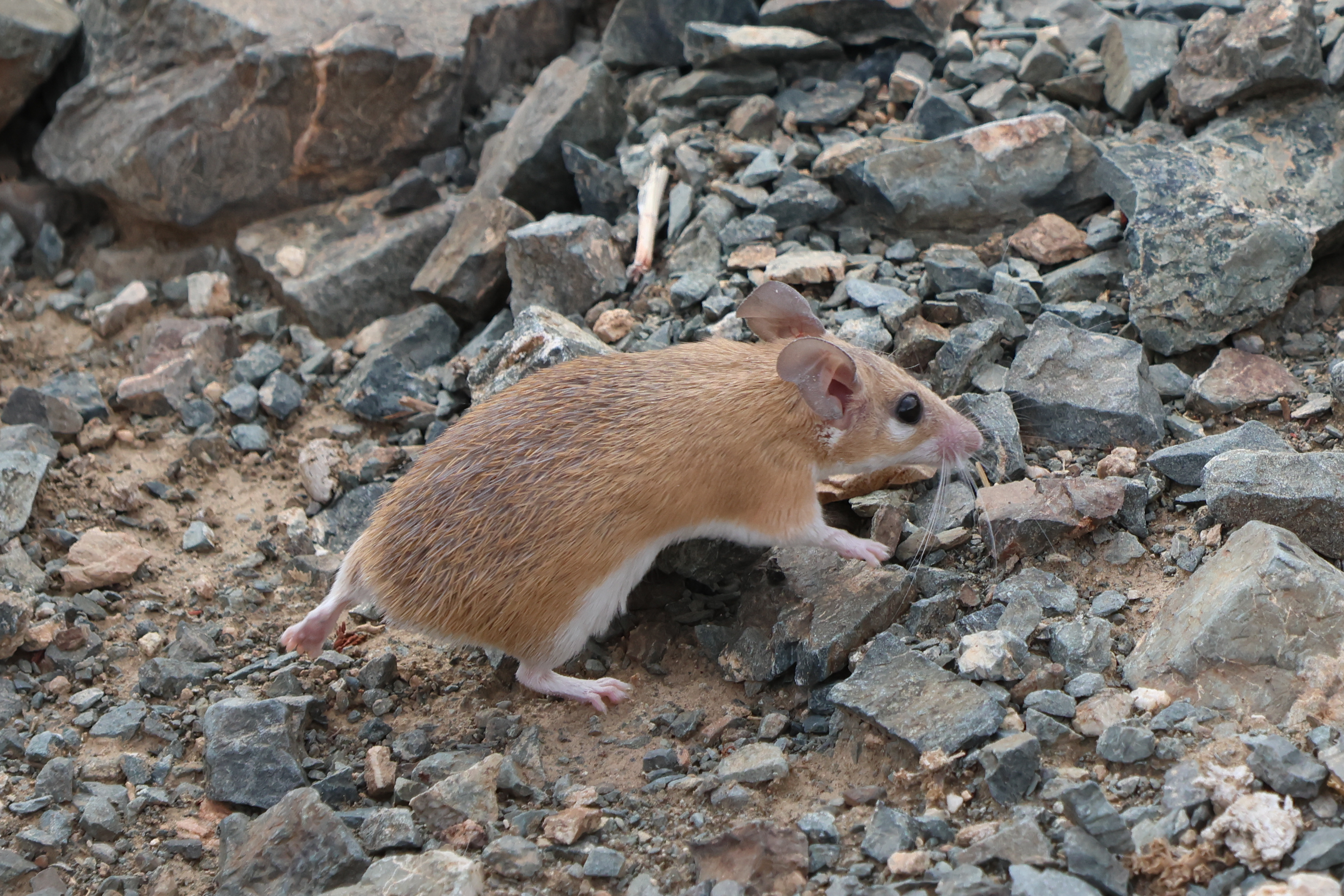
Tailless Arabian spiny mouse from eastern Saudi Arabia

The species is nocturnal, avoiding the heat of the day and foraging at night for seeds, and sometimes insects and grasses. It is a sociable animal and lives in small groups. Females become mature at about two months of age and can produce litters of up to five young after a gestation period of about 42 days. Another female in the family group may help with care of the young, which are weaned after about a fortnight.

Its spiny hair may help to prevent predation, perhaps making the animal harder to swallow, and this mouse is also capable of shedding its tail in order to escape from a predator. In captivity, this mouse can live for five years, but three years may be a more realistic life expectancy in the wild.

== Status ==
The eastern spiny mouse is common throughout most of its range. It is adaptable and no particular threats have been identified, so the International Union for Conservation of Nature has listed its conservation status as being of "least concern".
