= Mount Lefo brush-furred mouse =

Conservation status
- Critically Endangered (IUCN 3.1)

Scientific classification
- Kingdom: Animalia
- Phylum: Chordata
- Class: Mammalia
- Order: Rodentia
- Family: Muridae
- Genus: Lophuromys
- Species: L. eisentrauti

Binomial name
- Lophuromys eisentrauti Dieterlen, 1978

Species of rodent

The Mount Lefo brush-furred mouse (Lophuromys eisentrauti), also known as Eisentraut's brush-furred rat or, is a species of rodent in the family Muridae. It is only found in Mount Lefo, the western area of Cameroon.
