= Black-clawed brush-furred rat =

Conservation status
- Vulnerable (IUCN 3.1)

Scientific classification
- Kingdom: Animalia
- Phylum: Chordata
- Class: Mammalia
- Order: Rodentia
- Family: Muridae
- Genus: Lophuromys
- Species: L. melanonyx

Binomial name
- Lophuromys melanonyx Petter, 1972

Species of rodent

The black-clawed brush-furred rat (Lophuromys melanonyx) is a species of rodent in the family Muridae. It is found only in Ethiopia. Its natural habitat is subtropical or tropical high-altitude grassland. It is threatened by habitat loss.

== Sources ==
- Musser, G. G.; Carleton, M. D. (2005). "Superfamily Muroidea". In Wilson, D. E.; Reeder, D. M. (eds.). Mammal Species of the World: A Taxonomic and Geographic Reference (3rd ed.). Johns Hopkins University Press. p. 1207. ISBN 978-0-8018-8221-0. OCLC 62265494.
