= Rahm's brush-furred rat =

Conservation status
- Near Threatened (IUCN 3.1)

Scientific classification
- Kingdom: Animalia
- Phylum: Chordata
- Class: Mammalia
- Order: Rodentia
- Family: Muridae
- Genus: Lophuromys
- Species: L. rahmi

Binomial name
- Lophuromys rahmi Verheyen, 1964

Species of rodent

Rahm's brush-furred rat (Lophuromys rahmi) is a species of rodent in the family Muridae. It is found in Democratic Republic of the Congo, Rwanda, and Uganda. Its natural habitat is subtropical or tropical moist montane forests. It is threatened by habitat loss.
