= Yellow-bellied brush-furred rat =

Conservation status
- Least Concern (IUCN 3.1)

Scientific classification
- Kingdom: Animalia
- Phylum: Chordata
- Class: Mammalia
- Order: Rodentia
- Family: Muridae
- Genus: Lophuromys
- Species: L. luteogaster

Binomial name
- Lophuromys luteogaster Dieterlen, 1975

Species of rodent

The yellow-bellied brush-furred rat (Lophuromys luteogaster) is a species of rodent in the family Muridae. It has been recorded from the Democratic Republic of the Congo, Rwanda, and Uganda. It lives in rainforest and swamps. Although the species is considered to be rare, there do not seem to be any extant major threats to the population, and it is classified as Least Concern by the IUCN.
