= Southern African spiny mouse =

Conservation status
- Least Concern (IUCN 3.1)

Scientific classification
- Kingdom: Animalia
- Phylum: Chordata
- Class: Mammalia
- Order: Rodentia
- Family: Muridae
- Genus: Acomys
- Species: A. spinosissimus

Binomial name
- Acomys spinosissimus Peters, 1852

Synonyms
- Acomys selousi

Species of rodent

The southern African spiny mouse (Acomys spinosissimus) is a species of rodent in the family Muridae. It is found in Botswana, Democratic Republic of the Congo, Malawi, Mozambique, South Africa, Tanzania, Zambia, and Zimbabwe. Its natural habitats are moist savanna and rocky areas.
