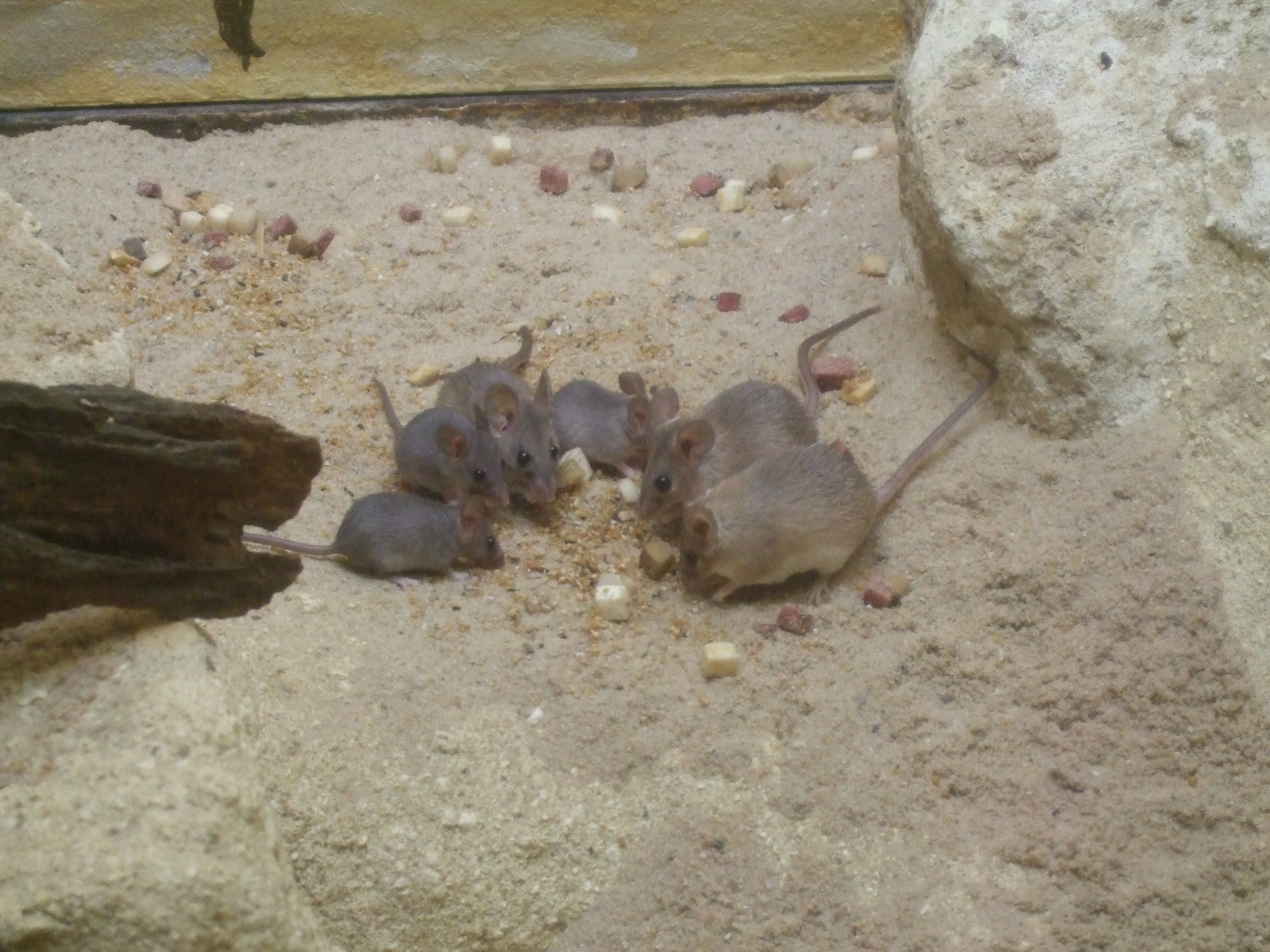

Conservation status
- Least Concern (IUCN 3.1)

Scientific classification
- Kingdom: Animalia
- Phylum: Chordata
- Class: Mammalia
- Order: Rodentia
- Family: Muridae
- Genus: Acomys
- Species: A. seurati

Binomial name
- Acomys seurati Heim de Balsac, 1936

= Seurat's spiny mouse =

Species of rodent

Seurat's spiny mouse (Acomys seurati) is a species of rodent in the family Muridae. It is found only in Algeria. Its natural habitats are rocky areas and hot deserts.
