= Medium-tailed brush-furred rat =

Conservation status
- Vulnerable (IUCN 3.1)

Scientific classification
- Kingdom: Animalia
- Phylum: Chordata
- Class: Mammalia
- Order: Rodentia
- Family: Muridae
- Genus: Lophuromys
- Species: L. medicaudatus

Binomial name
- Lophuromys medicaudatus Dieterlen, 1975

Species of rodent

The medium-tailed brush-furred rat (Lophuromys medicaudatus) is a species of rodent in the family Muridae. It has been recorded from the Democratic Republic of the Congo, Rwanda, and Uganda. It lives in rainforest and swamps. It is a rare species which is threatened by habitat loss.
