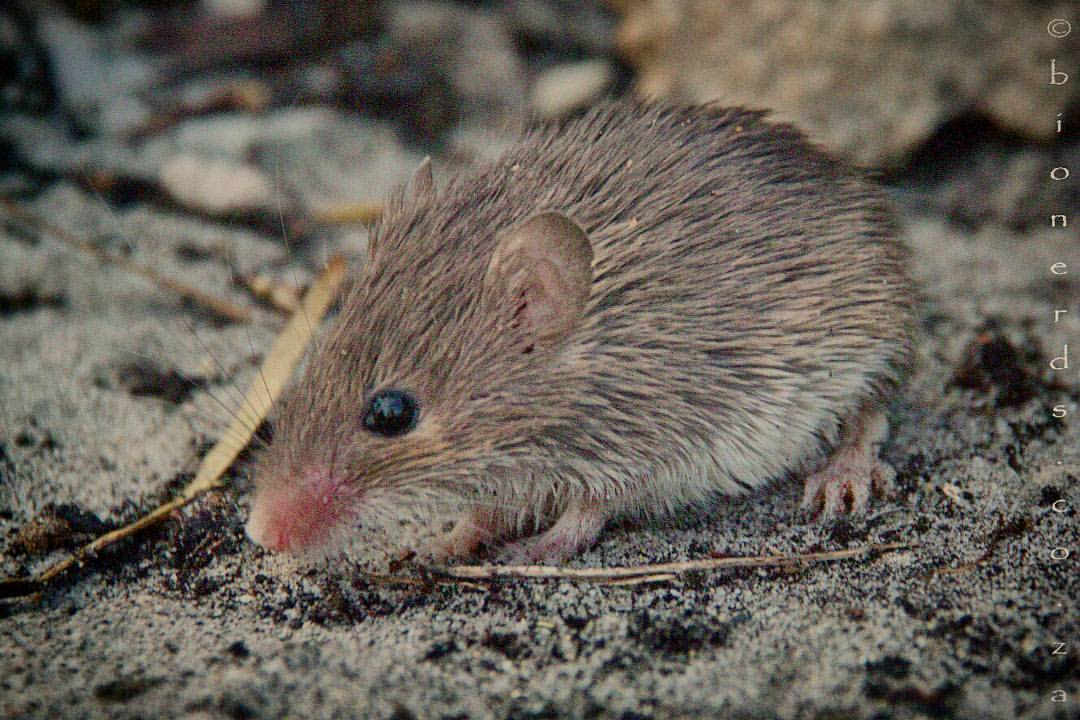

Conservation status
- Least Concern (IUCN 3.1)

Scientific classification
- Kingdom: Animalia
- Phylum: Chordata
- Class: Mammalia
- Order: Rodentia
- Family: Muridae
- Genus: Acomys
- Species: A. subspinosus

Binomial name
- Acomys subspinosus (Waterhouse, 1838)
- Extant (resident)

= Cape spiny mouse =

Species of rodent endemic to South Africa

The Cape spiny mouse (Acomys subspinosus) is a murid rodent found in the Western Cape province of South Africa. They have a dorsal covering of spiny hairs with dark grey-brown colouration, and a white underbelly. The Cape spiny mouse has large eyes and ears and a scaly, nearly bald tail that is brittle and can break off readily either as a whole or in part if it is caught. Their total length is 17 cm (6.7 in), with an 8 cm (3.1 in) tail, and they typically weigh 22 g (0.78 oz).

== Range ==
This species is largely endemic to the Western Cape province of South Africa; its range just extends into the Eastern and Northern Cape provinces. The extent of occurrence is greater than 20,000 km^{2} (7,700 sq mi), and can occur up to about 1,000 m (3,300 ft) above sea level.

== Habitat ==
Its natural habitats are Mediterranean-type shrubby vegetation and rocky areas. They are terrestrial and nocturnal, but can be active in early morning and late afternoon in shadows cast by rocks.

== Behaviour ==
Cape spiny mice may live singly or in small groups. They feed almost exclusively on seeds, especially ant dispersed seeds of Restionaceae and Proteaceae with elaiosomes. The remainder of the diet consists of green plant material and insects, millipedes, and snails. In addition, the cape spiny mouse feed extensively on Protea humiflora flower.

== Breeding ==
Rather than having one set breeding season, cape spiny mice are opportunistic breeders, only reproducing when they have sufficient food sources. They produce litters of 2-5 pups.

== Value ==
The cape spiny mouse contributes significantly to the pollination of Protea humiflora, and in turn gains the food resources that enable winter breeding. It is also the primary pollinator of Erica hanekomii, a low-growing, mat-forming plant with pendulous flowerheads, containing significant amounts of sugar-rich nectar. In addition to being a potential pollinator for further fynbos plant species, it also has a role in seed predation and hoarding in the fynbos, potentially contributing to the evolution of myrmecochory as a mechanism to evade rodent seed predation.
