= Hutterer's brush-furred mouse =

Conservation status
- Least Concern (IUCN 3.1)

Scientific classification
- Kingdom: Animalia
- Phylum: Chordata
- Class: Mammalia
- Order: Rodentia
- Family: Muridae
- Genus: Lophuromys
- Species: L. huttereri

Binomial name
- Lophuromys huttereri W. Verheyen, Colyn & Hulselmans, 1996

Species of rodent

Hutterer's brush-furred mouse or Hutterer's brush-furred rat (Lophuromys huttereri) is a species of rodent in the family Muridae. It is found only in Democratic Republic of the Congo, where its natural habitat is subtropical or tropical moist lowland forests.
