= Johan's spiny mouse =

Conservation status
- Least Concern (IUCN 3.1)

Scientific classification
- Kingdom: Animalia
- Phylum: Chordata
- Class: Mammalia
- Order: Rodentia
- Family: Muridae
- Genus: Acomys
- Species: A. johannis

Binomial name
- Acomys johannis Thomas, 1912

Species of rodent

Johan's spiny mouse (Acomys johannis) is a species of rodent in the family Muridae. It is found in Benin, Burkina Faso, Cameroon, Chad, Ghana, Mali, Niger, Nigeria, and Togo. Its natural habitats are subtropical or tropical dry shrubland, subtropical or tropical dry lowland grassland, and rocky areas.
