= Dieterlen's brush-furred mouse =

Conservation status
- Endangered (IUCN 3.1)

Scientific classification
- Kingdom: Animalia
- Phylum: Chordata
- Class: Mammalia
- Order: Rodentia
- Family: Muridae
- Genus: Lophuromys
- Species: L. dieterleni

Binomial name
- Lophuromys dieterleni Verheyen, Huselmans, Colyn & Hutterer, 1997

Species of rodent

Dieterlen's brush-furred mouse, Mt Oku brush-furred mouse, or Mount Oku brush-furred rat (Lophuromys dieterleni) is a species of rodent in the family Muridae. It is endemic to Mount Oku, Cameroon. Its natural habitat is montane forest at elevations above 2,000 m (6,600 ft).
