= Fire-bellied brush-furred rat =

Conservation status
- Least Concern (IUCN 3.1)

Scientific classification
- Kingdom: Animalia
- Phylum: Chordata
- Class: Mammalia
- Order: Rodentia
- Family: Muridae
- Genus: Lophuromys
- Species: L. nudicaudus

Binomial name
- Lophuromys nudicaudus Heller, 1911

Species of rodent

The fire-bellied brush-furred rat (Lophuromys nudicaudus) is a species of rodent in the family Muridae. It is found in Cameroon, Central African Republic, the Republic of the Congo, the Democratic Republic of the Congo, Equatorial Guinea, and Gabon. Its natural habitat is subtropical or tropical moist lowland forests.
