= Woosnam's brush-furred rat =

Conservation status
- Least Concern (IUCN 3.1)

Scientific classification
- Kingdom: Animalia
- Phylum: Chordata
- Class: Mammalia
- Order: Rodentia
- Family: Muridae
- Genus: Lophuromys
- Species: L. woosnami

Binomial name
- Lophuromys woosnami Thomas, 1906

Species of rodent

The Woosnam's brush-furred rat (Lophuromys woosnami) is a species of rodent in the family Muridae. It is found in Burundi, the Democratic Republic of the Congo, Rwanda, and Uganda. Its natural habitat types include mountain forest clearings and bamboo forests.
