= Short-tailed brush-furred rat =

Conservation status
- Near Threatened (IUCN 3.1)

Scientific classification
- Kingdom: Animalia
- Phylum: Chordata
- Class: Mammalia
- Order: Rodentia
- Family: Muridae
- Genus: Lophuromys
- Species: L. brevicaudus

Binomial name
- Lophuromys brevicaudus Osgood, 1936

Species of rodent

The short-tailed brush-furred rat (Lophuromys brevicaudus) is a species of rodent in the family Muridae. It is found only in Ethiopia. Its natural habitats are subtropical or tropical high-altitude shrubland and subtropical or tropical high-altitude grassland. It is threatened by habitat loss.
