= Angolan brush-furred rat =

Scientific classification
- Kingdom: Animalia
- Phylum: Chordata
- Class: Mammalia
- Order: Rodentia
- Family: Muridae
- Genus: Lophuromys
- Species: L. angolensis

Binomial name
- Lophuromys angolensis Verheyen, Dierckx & Hulselmans, 2000

Species of rodent

The Angolan brush-furred rat (Lophuromys angolensis) is a species of brush-furred mouse found in Angola and the southwest of the Democratic Republic of Congo.

== Morphology ==
The species has a dark color coat with stiff textured fur. Its overall body built is a stubby body with short legs, however it is slightly more slender and long than L. sikapusi. The tail length of L. angolensis is on average 75mm, 6mm longer than L. sikapusi. Between the male and females, there is very little sexual dimorphism. L. angolensis has an average weight of 80% of L. sikapusi, which weighs on average from 45 to 90 grams.

L. angolensis can be distinguished from L. sikapusi by its more slender and shorter rostrum, its somewhat narrower braincase, and its more slender and somewhat shorter upper and lower dental arches. L. angolensis is somewhat smaller than L. sikapusi and L. ansorgei in all craniometrical measures except for its smallest interorbital breadth, its greatest breadth of choanae, and its depth of upper incisor, in which it equals the size of L. sikapusi and L. ansorgei.

== Taxonomy ==
The species was treated as part of Lophuromys sikapusi until 2000, when Walter Verheyen, Theo Diercxk, and Jan Hulselmans released a study describing it as a distinct species, Lophuromys angolensis.
