= Gray spiny mouse =

Conservation status
- Least Concern (IUCN 3.1)

Scientific classification
- Kingdom: Animalia
- Phylum: Chordata
- Class: Mammalia
- Order: Rodentia
- Family: Muridae
- Genus: Acomys
- Species: A. cineraceus

Binomial name
- Acomys cineraceus Fitzinger & Heuglin, 1866
- Geographic range

Synonyms
- Acomys cinerasceus Fitzinger & Heuglin, 1866; Acomys cinerascens Heuglin, 1877; Acomys hystrella Heller, 1911; Acomys witherbyi de Winton, 1901

Species of rodent

The gray spiny mouse (Acomys cineraceus) is a species of rodent in the family Muridae found in Ethiopia, Kenya, South Sudan, and Uganda. Its natural habitats are dry savanna, moist savanna, rocky areas, arable land, and rural gardens.
