= Mount Cameroon brush-furred rat =

Conservation status
- Least Concern (IUCN 3.1)

Scientific classification
- Kingdom: Animalia
- Phylum: Chordata
- Class: Mammalia
- Order: Rodentia
- Family: Muridae
- Genus: Lophuromys
- Species: L. roseveari

Binomial name
- Lophuromys roseveari Verheyen, Huselmans, Colyn & Hutterer, 1997

Species of rodent

The Mount Cameroon brush-furred rat or Rosevear's brush-furred mouse (Lophuromys roseveari) is a species of rodent in the family Muridae. It is found only in Cameroon. Its natural habitats are subtropical or tropical moist montane forests, subtropical or tropical moist shrubland, subtropical or tropical high-altitude shrubland, subtropical or tropical high-altitude grassland, plantations, and rural gardens.
