= Verhagen's brush-furred rat =

Scientific classification
- Kingdom: Animalia
- Phylum: Chordata
- Class: Mammalia
- Order: Rodentia
- Family: Muridae
- Genus: Lophuromys
- Species: L. verhageni

Binomial name
- Lophuromys verhageni E. Verheyen, Hulselmans, Dierckx & W. Verheyen, 2002

Species of rodent

Verhagen's brush-furred rat (Lophuromys verhageni) is a rodent belonging to the genus Lophuromys. It is found between 2600 and 3050 m on Mount Meru in Tanzania. The species is named after Ronald Verhegen for his contributions to the ecology of small mammals of Tanzania.

It has a fairly large overall size. It has a large but slender skull with weak supraorbital ridges, and a short tail. The species was split from the species L. flavopunctatus in 2002
