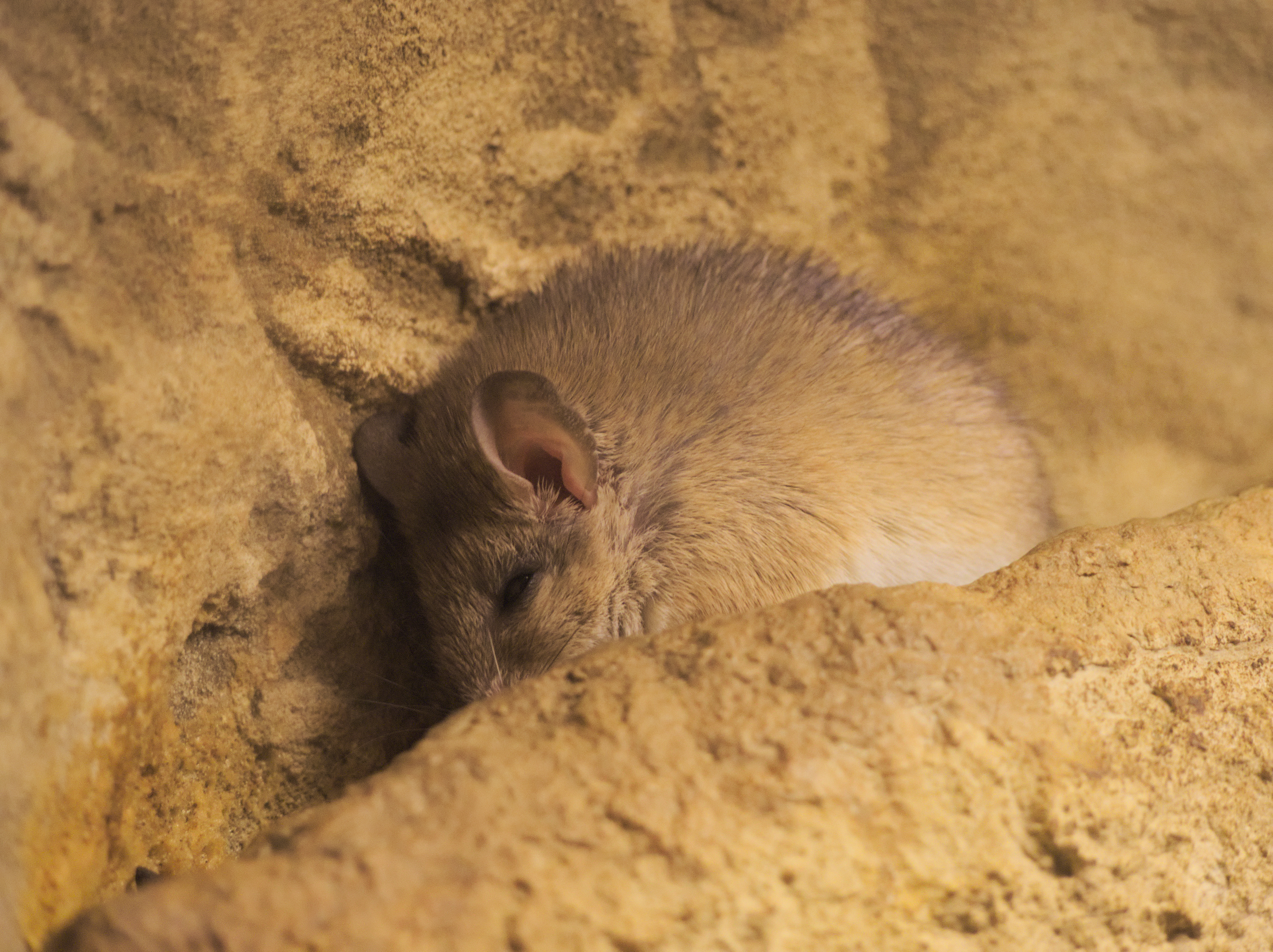
- An Acomys minous at the Natural History Museum of Crete

Conservation status
- Data Deficient (IUCN 3.1)

Scientific classification
- Kingdom: Animalia
- Phylum: Chordata
- Class: Mammalia
- Order: Rodentia
- Family: Muridae
- Genus: Acomys
- Species: A. minous

Binomial name
- Acomys minous Bate, 1906

= Crete spiny mouse =

Species of rodent

The Crete spiny mouse (Acomys minous) is a species of mouse endemic to Crete. It is characterized by the coarse, stiff hairs on its back and tail and a notably grayer coloration and more pointed face than other species of spiny mice. Its fur color varies from yellow to red, gray or brown on its face and back, with white fur on its underside. It is a nocturnal forager, feeding mainly on grass blades and seeds, and builds only a very rudimentary nest.

The gestation is between five and six weeks, which is unusually long for a mouse. At birth, other females clean and assist the mother. The young are well developed with open eyes when they are born.

Its taxonomic position is uncertain (it may be a variant of the Cairo spiny mouse) leading the IUCN to consider it data deficient, but it is common within its range and even if a valid species it is not threatened.

== Phylogenetics ==
The Cretan spiny mouse exists in three distinct chromosomal forms across the island, with chromosome numbers of 38, 40, or 42. Scientists believe the 42-chromosome form is the oldest version, with the others evolving through a process where chromosomes fuse together. These different forms can successfully interbreed where their territories overlap, producing healthy hybrid offspring.

DNA studies suggest that Cretan spiny mice belong to two genetic lineages despite looking virtually identical. This genetic split likely occurred before mice ever reached Crete. The Cretan spiny mouse is part of the cahirinus group, which includes similar mice from Cyprus, Turkey, and North Africa – all so genetically similar that some scientists suggest they might be varieties of a single species rather than truly distinct species.

Evidence indicates that these mice are not native to Crete but arrived relatively recently, possibly brought by humans during ancient times. They likely originated from North African populations, with either multiple colonization events or the founding population already containing genetic diversity. Their isolated existence on Crete may eventually lead to complete speciation, though currently their divergence from mainland relatives remains minimal.

In 2025, a chromosome-level reference genome was released as part of the European Reference Genome Atlas (ERGA) initiative.
