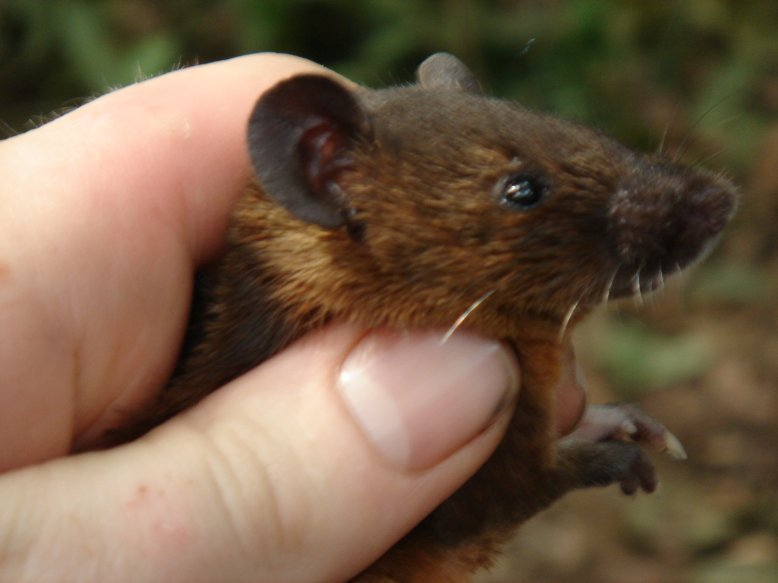

Conservation status
- Least Concern (IUCN 3.1)

Scientific classification
- Kingdom: Animalia
- Phylum: Chordata
- Class: Mammalia
- Order: Rodentia
- Family: Muridae
- Genus: Lophuromys
- Species: L. sikapusi

Binomial name
- Lophuromys sikapusi (Temminck, 1853)

= Rusty-bellied brush-furred rat =

Species of rodent

The rusty-bellied brush-furred rat (Lophuromys sikapusi) is a species of rodent in the family Muridae. It is found in Angola, Benin, Cameroon, Central African Republic, Republic of the Congo, Democratic Republic of the Congo, Ivory Coast, Equatorial Guinea, Gabon, Ghana, Guinea, Kenya, Liberia, Nigeria, Sierra Leone, Tanzania, Togo, and Uganda. Its natural habitats are subtropical or tropical moist lowland forests, subtropical or tropical seasonally wet or flooded lowland grassland, arable land, and pastureland.

== Habitat ==
The range of L. sikapusi species extends from Sierra Leone to the Ivory Coast, Uganda, North Angola, Tanzania, Benin, West Kenya, and Zaire. This species is also found on the northern bank of the Congo River in Zaire.

Out of the Lophuromys rodents, they occupy the largest geographical range. They are highly flexible to adapt to a wide range of habitats of life. Tropical lowland and subtropical land with adequate moisture is their usual habitat. They are dependent on moist grass land habitats, and are absent in very dry land or closed forests. These rodents are also Savannah dwellers that prefer habitat with some brushes.

== Morphology ==
The rusty-bellied brush furred mice have a dark color coat with stiff textured fur. Their overall body built is a stubby body with short legs. Between males and females, also known as "bucks" and "does" respectively, there is very little sexual dimorphism. The only significant dimorphism is that the males are larger in size in comparison to their female counterparts. An average rusty-bellied brush-furred rat weighs from 45 to 90 grams. They possess a short tail length in comparison to most African rodentia species. L. sikapusi has a shorter tail length than L. angolensis. L. sikapusi possesses an approximately similar head to tail body length ratio in comparison with other African rodents. Compared to Lemniscomys striatus specimens, L. sikapusi has relatively a shorter tail length and hind foot length. Their average tail length is 69 mm, and can be at a maximum of 82 mm. The rostrum resembles a shrew-like appearance. Their rostrums are slightly longer than the species L. flavopunctatus. Their cheek teeth have three rows of cusps, not only two as seen in Cricetidae (the family consisting of voles, lemmings, and New world rats).

== Diet ==
The diet of L. sikapusi is characterized by insects such as ants, reptiles, seeds, palms, fibre, soft-bodied invertebrates, and vegetable materials that are abundant in the tropical land environments. Their food resources are limited by dry habitat. The dry habitat may also expose these rodents to predators by depriving them of the shelter they need. On the other hand, the wet season increases disease rate while increasing the abundance of food sources. Approximately 98% of food consumed is used toward maintaining a steady body temperature. Only 2% is used toward building new tissue. The energy dynamic of this animal is characteristic of rodents and mammals that are constantly losing energy through respiratory heat loss. Therefore, they need a high energy source to maintain a stable body temperature.

=== Digestive system ===
The digestive system of this species is unique. There is a distinctive bump along the great curvature in the stomach. It is considered to be a bilocular stomach, that aids in digesting plant-based diets. It allows adaptation to a variety of food sources. The digestive system of L. sikapusi, especially the stomach structure is very similar to Onychomys. The stomach of L. sikapusi does not show insectivorous diet anatomical arrangements. It is thought to aid the young to absorb large amount of milk in their stomach during period of growth. The stomach of L. sikapusi lacks pyloric glands. Their large stomach allows for heavy mixing of bolus after eating. Their stomach also maintains a relatively high pH range so the enzyme salivary amylase may continue to digest carbohydrates, starch, and glycogen from the food consumed. When there is inadequate water intake due to dry climates in the environment, these rodents produce concentrated urine and dry fecal matter to retain water so they may keep themselves hydrated.

== Behavior ==
L. sikapusi have territorial behavior similar to many African rodents, that engage in fights when placed in close proximity to other rodents. There are bodily damages such as torn ears, and mutilated tails from fights among themselves. This species of rodents prefer to be alone. Species such as the Mastomys rat are discovered to be competitors to the Lophuromys species.

== Growth and reproduction ==
This type of brush-furred mice produces small litters of offspring, called pups, after a gestation period of approximately 21 days. The young grow very rapidly, and may grow from 8 to 20 grams within the first five days after birth. The average amount of offspring from each litter is two, and it can go up to four pups. The infant rusty-bellied brush-furred mice become active in four to seven days, and their eyes begin to open. The coat is completed growing in a week after birth. The infants weigh about 25 grams by the tenth day. They may begin breeding at around 2 months of age.
