= Gray brush-furred rat =

Conservation status
- Data Deficient (IUCN 3.1)

Scientific classification
- Kingdom: Animalia
- Phylum: Chordata
- Class: Mammalia
- Order: Rodentia
- Family: Muridae
- Genus: Lophuromys
- Species: L. aquilus

Binomial name
- Lophuromys aquilus (True, 1892)

Species of rodent

The gray brush-furred rat (Lophuromys aquilus) is a species of rodent in the family Muridae. It is found only in Democratic Republic of the Congo. Its natural habitats are subtropical or tropical swamps, subtropical or tropical moist montane forests, and subtropical or tropical high-altitude grassland. It is threatened by habitat loss.
