= Muze spiny mouse =

Conservation status
- Least Concern (IUCN 3.1)

Scientific classification
- Kingdom: Animalia
- Phylum: Chordata
- Class: Mammalia
- Order: Rodentia
- Family: Muridae
- Genus: Acomys
- Species: A. muzei

Binomial name
- Acomys muzei Verheyen, Hulselmans, Wendelen, Leirs, Corti, Backeljau & Verheyen, 2011

Species of rodent

The Muze spiny mouse (Acomys muzei) is a species of rodent in the family Muridae found in the Democratic Republic of Congo, Zambia, and Tanzania.
