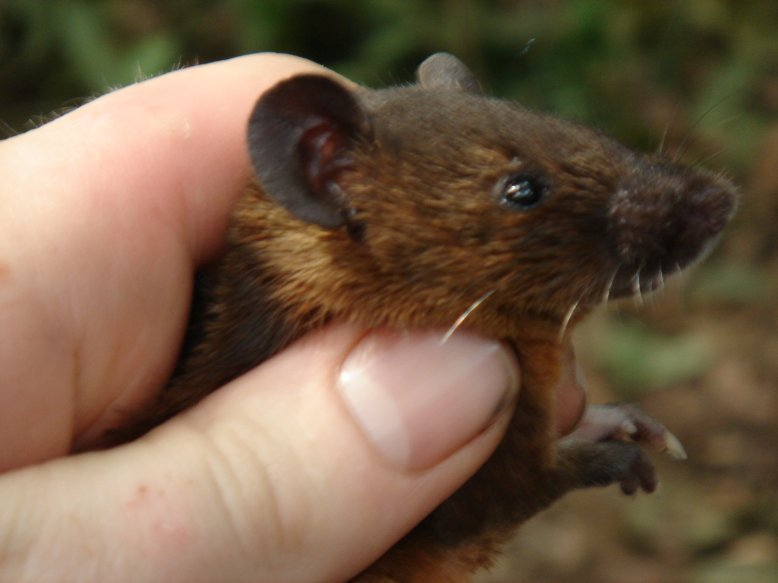
- Rusty-bellied brush-furred rat (Lophuromys sikapusi)

Scientific classification
- Kingdom: Animalia
- Phylum: Chordata
- Class: Mammalia
- Order: Rodentia
- Family: Muridae
- Subfamily: Deomyinae
- Genus: Lophuromys; Peters, 1874

Type species
- Lasiomys afer Temminck, 1853 (= Mus sikapusi Temminck, 1853)

Species
- See text

= Brush-furred mouse =

Genus of rodents

The brush-furred mice, genus Lophuromys, are a group of rodents found in sub-Saharan Africa. They are members of the subfamily Deomyinae, a group only identifiable through molecular analysis. Lophuromys is also known as the brush-furred rats, harsh-furred rats or coarse-haired mice.

== Characteristics ==
The brush-furred mice are so named due to the unique, stiff hairs that make up their pelage. The texture is similar to a soft brush. They are peculiar looking for several reasons. The coat varies depending on species, but ranges from tan to greenish greys and dark brown. Some species have an almost purplish tint to the pelage and others can be speckled. The underside is rusty, orange, brown, or cream-colored. They are chunky mice with relatively short legs.

Most animals have noticeable scars, notched ears, or are missing part of their tails. The skin is delicate and the animals appear to use this as a predator avoidance technique. The tail breaks easily and may be lost so that the animal can escape. Once lost, it does not regenerate. The skin tears easily, particularly in strategic positions such as the scruff of the neck. In fact, if an animal is held by the scruff of the neck, it is capable of struggling its way free by tearing itself loose, leaving behind a patch of skin and fur. It is rare to find specimens in museums without sewn-up tears.

== Habitat and diet ==
Brush-furred mice appear to require moist areas and perhaps grasses. They are generally excluded from dry savannahs and forests with dense canopies. They are variable in degree of diurnality versus nocturnality.

They appear to feed more on animal matter than most muroids. The proportion of animal material in the diet ranges from 40 to 100% depending on species. Food consists of ants, other insects and invertebrates, small vertebrates, carrion, and plant matter.

== Behaviour ==
Brush-furred mice are solitary and are reported to fight when placed together. This may contribute to the wounds found on individuals. A brush-furred mouse was recorded to have lived for over 3 years in captivity.

Allopatric speciation appears to have played an important role in shaping the evolution of this genus. Research conducted on the group suggests that isolated species exist a relatively short distance away from one another. Gene flow is either absent or greatly restricted among these isolated pockets. This has led to differences detectable by karyotype, allozymes, and DNA sequencing. The number of recognized species in this genus has increased in recent years and is probably still not representative of the true diversity of this group.

== Regeneration ==
Lophuromys have recently been shown to undergo epimorphic regeneration of ear pinna injuries, a trait shared with the sister genus Acomys spp. Prior to this, the only unifying trait within Deomyinae, beyond the DNA sequences that phylogenetically grouped them, was the presence of osteoderms in their tails.

== Species ==
21 species were accepted in this genus in 2005. This number has grown to 34.

- Genus Lophuromys - brush-furred mice
  - Subgenus Kivumys
    - Yellow-bellied brush-furred rat, Lophuromys luteogaster
    - Medium-tailed brush-furred rat, Lophuromys medicaudatus
    - Woosnam's brush-furred rat, Lophuromys woosnami
  - Subgenus Lophuromys
    - Angolan brush-furred mouse, Lophuromys angolensis
    - Ansorge's brush-furred mouse, Lophuromys ansorgei
    - Gray brush-furred rat, Lophuromys aquilus
    - Short-tailed brush-furred rat, Lophuromys brevicaudus
    - Thomas's Ethiopian brush-furred rat, Lophuromys brunneus
    - Mount Chercher brush-furred rat, Lophuromys chercherensis
    - Ethiopian forest brush-furred rat, Lophuromys chrysopus
    - Dieterlen's brush-furred mouse, Lophuromys dieterleni
    - Dudu's brush-furred rat, Lophuromys dudui
    - Eisentraut's brush-furred rat, Lophuromys eisentrauti
    - Yellow-spotted brush-furred rat, Lophuromys flavopunctatus
    - Hutterer's brush-furred mouse, Lophuromys huttereri
    - Kilonzo's brush furred rat, Lophuromys kilonzoi
    - Machangu's brush furred rat, Lophuromys machangui
    - Makundi's brush-furred rat, Lophuromys makundii
    - Black-clawed brush-furred rat, Lophuromys melanonyx
    - North Western Rift brush-furred rat, Lophuromys menageshae
    - Fire-bellied brush-furred rat, Lophuromys nudicaudus
    - Sheko Forest brush-furred rat, Lophuromys pseudosikapusi
    - Rahm's brush-furred rat, Lophuromys rahmi
    - Mount Cameroon brush-furred rat, Lophuromys roseveari
    - Sabuni's brush-furred rat, Lophuromys sabunii
    - Rusty-bellied brush-furred rat, Lophuromys sikapusi
    - Verhagen's brush-furred mouse, Lophuromys verhageni
    - Zena's brush-furred rat, Lophuromys zena
  - Unsorted
    - Lophuromys laticeps
    - Lophuromys margarettae
    - Lophuromys rita
    - Lophuromys simensis
    - Stanley's brush-furred rat, Lophuromys stanleyi
