= Wilfred Hudson Osgood =

American zoologist (1875–1947)

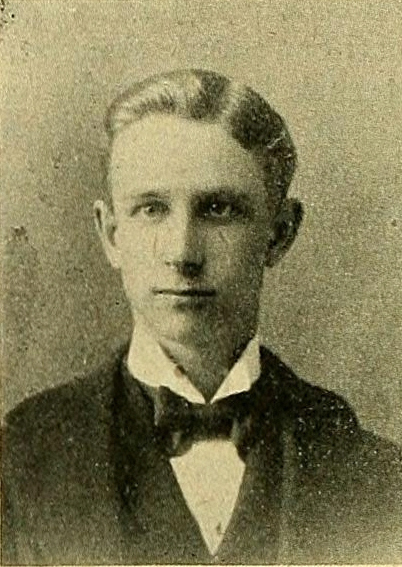
Wilfred Hudson Osgood in 1897

Wilfred Hudson Osgood (December 8, 1875 – June 20, 1947) was an American zoologist.

== Biography ==
Osgood was born in Rochester, New Hampshire, the oldest child of a family of watchmakers. The family moved to California in 1888 and he went to study in Santa Clara and San Jose. He joined in the activities of the Cooper Ornithological Club and found company in Chester Barlow and Rollo H. Beck. He taught at a school in Arizona for a year and then moved to the newly formed Stanford University, where he came to meet Charles H. Gilbert and David Starr Jordan. He joined the staff of the Bureau of Economic Ornithology and Mammalogy, of the United States Department of Agriculture at the age of 22. This group later became the Bureau of Biological Survey under Clinton Hart Merriam.

In 1909 he moved to the Field Museum of Natural History in Chicago, where he was assistant curator of mammalogy and ornithology from 1909 to 1921, and curator of zoology from 1921 to 1940. He collected in North America and Chile. He traveled with Louis Agassiz Fuertes to Ethiopia as part of the 1926-27 Field Museum-Chicago Daily News Abyssinian Expedition. He wrote The Mammals of Chile (1943) and co-wrote Artist and Naturalist in Ethiopia (1936). He died a bachelor on 20 June 1947.

While working at the Field Museum, he was elected a member of the London Zoological Society (along with Theodore Roosevelt) in 1910.

== Literature ==
- Osgood, W.H. (1899). "Wilfred H. Osgood diary, Alaska, 1899". Field Museum of Natural History.
- Osgood, W.H. (1900). "Wilfred H. Osgood diary, British Columbia and Alaska, 1900". Field Museum of Natural History.
- Osgood, W.H. (1926–1927). "Chicago Daily News Abyssinian Expedition". Field Museum of Natural History.
- Osgood, W.H. (1927). "Wilfred H. Osgood diary, Abyssinia". Field Museum of Natural History.
- Patterson, B.D. (1983). "The journal of Wilfred Osgood: The Marshall Field Chilean Expedition of 1922–23". Field Museum of Natural History Bulletin. 54 (2): 8–11, 28–33.
- Osgood, W.H. (1937). "Wilfred H. Osgood diary, French Indochina, 1937". Field Museum of Natural History.
- Osgood, W.H. (1943). "The mammals of Chile". Fieldiana Zoology. 30: 1–268.
