= Yellow-spotted brush-furred rat =

Conservation status
- Least Concern (IUCN 3.1)

Scientific classification
- Kingdom: Animalia
- Phylum: Chordata
- Class: Mammalia
- Order: Rodentia
- Family: Muridae
- Genus: Lophuromys
- Species: L. flavopunctatus

Binomial name
- Lophuromys flavopunctatus Thomas, 1888

Species of rodent

The yellow-spotted brush-furred rat (Lophuromys flavopunctatus) is a species of rodent in the family Muridae found in Angola, the Democratic Republic of the Congo, Ethiopia, Kenya, Malawi, Mozambique, South Sudan, Tanzania, and Zambia. Its natural habitats are subtropical or tropical moist lowland forest, subtropical or tropical moist montane forest, and subtropical or tropical high-altitude grassland. The population in Ethiopia is isolated and can be found at high altitudes up to 4,500 m above sea level.
