= Erik Verheyen =

Belgian zoologist

- Born: Erik Karel Verheyen; 1958 (age 67–68)
- Education: Ghent University; University of Antwerp
- Known for: Research on African biodiversity; description of mammal and fish species
- Father: Walter Verheyen
- Scientific career
- Fields: Zoology, mammalogy, ichthyology
- Workplaces: Royal Belgian Institute of Natural Sciences; University of Antwerp

Erik Karel Verheyen (born 1958), sometimes cited as Erik K. Verheyen, is a Belgian zoologist. His research focuses on the biodiversity of Sub-Saharan Africa, particularly its fish and small mammals.

== Biography ==
Verheyen is the son of Walter Verheyen, a prominent Belgian mammalogist. He obtained his master's degree from Ghent University in 1982. In 1990, he received his doctorate from the University of Antwerp with a dissertation entitled Adaptive Radiation and Speciation in African Lacustrine Cichlidae: Genetical and Ecophysiological Aspects.

Following his postdoctoral research at the Royal Belgian Institute of Natural Sciences (RBINS), he became a scientific staff member at the institution in 1991. Since 2005, he has headed the Operational Directorate of Taxonomy and Phylogeny for vertebrates. In 2008, he became research director of the Evolutionary Ecology group in the Department of Biology at the University of Antwerp. Since February 2012, he has headed the institute's molecular laboratory for vertebrates. The research projects conducted by his laboratory have included integrated monitoring of the Congo Basin to reduce carbon emissions from forests and conserve biodiversity; behavioural and genomic aspects of speciation in cichlids; the effects of human activities on the health of ecosystems and resources in Lake Edward; and strengthening research, policy and management capacities through the development of a network of stakeholders in the African Great Lakes drainage basin.

Other projects have involved restriction-site-associated DNA sequencing (RAD-seq) to reconstruct the evolutionary history of cichlids belonging to the Lake Victoria Region Superflock; monitoring the population development of the barn owl in Belgium following the popularity of the Harry Potter series; research on rodents of Sub-Saharan Africa; changes in biodiversity in African forests; and emerging infectious diseases. His laboratory has also investigated the identification of sylvatic reservoir hosts of arthropod-borne viruses through large-scale serological mapping of African wildlife to identify species susceptible to outbreaks.

Verheyen is the author of more than 150 scientific publications, including Origin of the superflock of cichlid fishes from Lake Victoria, East Africa. In 2002, he was among the scientists who described the rodent species Lophuromys dudui and Lophuromys verhageni.

In 2003, he and his father jointly described three species of African pouched rats: Dasymys cabrali, Dasymys rwandae and Dasymys sua.

From 2007 onwards, Verheyen contributed to the African Rodentia database of the University of Antwerp, which was renamed African Mammalia in 2019. In 2007, he also participated in the first description of Lophuromys makundii. In 2010, he described the Walter's duiker (Philantomba walteri), naming the species after his father.

In 2011, together with Peter J. Taylor and Michael D. Carleton, he described the Cheesman's mountain rat (Otomys cheesemani), which had not been recorded since 1968, as well as the extant species Otomys simiensis and Otomys yaldeni.

In the same year, he described the rodents Acomys muzei and Acomys ngurui.

In 2013, Verheyen reported the rediscovery of the African spotted bat (Niumbaha superba) in the Democratic Republic of the Congo.

In the same year, he was part of the team that described the hero shrew (Scutisorex thori), a species notable for its exceptionally strong vertebral column.

== Eponymous taxa ==
In 2020, the elephantfish species Marcusenius verheyenorum was named in honour of Erik Verheyen and his father Walter Verheyen.

== Selected bibliography ==
- Beolens, Bo; Grayson, Michael; Watkins, Michael (2023). Eponym Dictionary of Fishes. Whittles Publishing. ISBN 978-1-84995-498-3.
