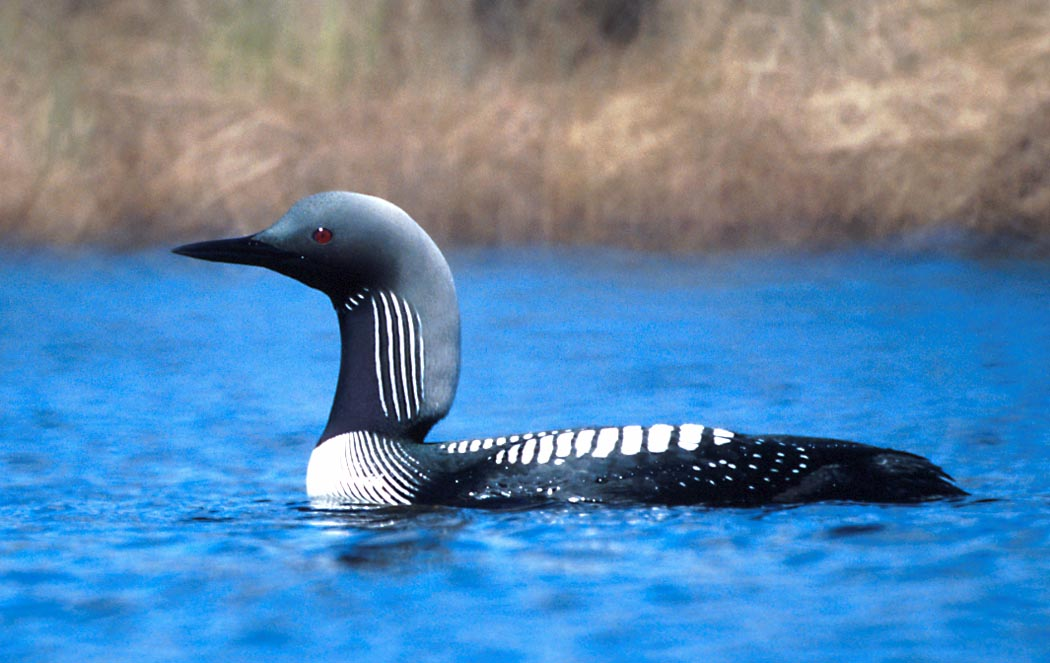
- Breeding plumage
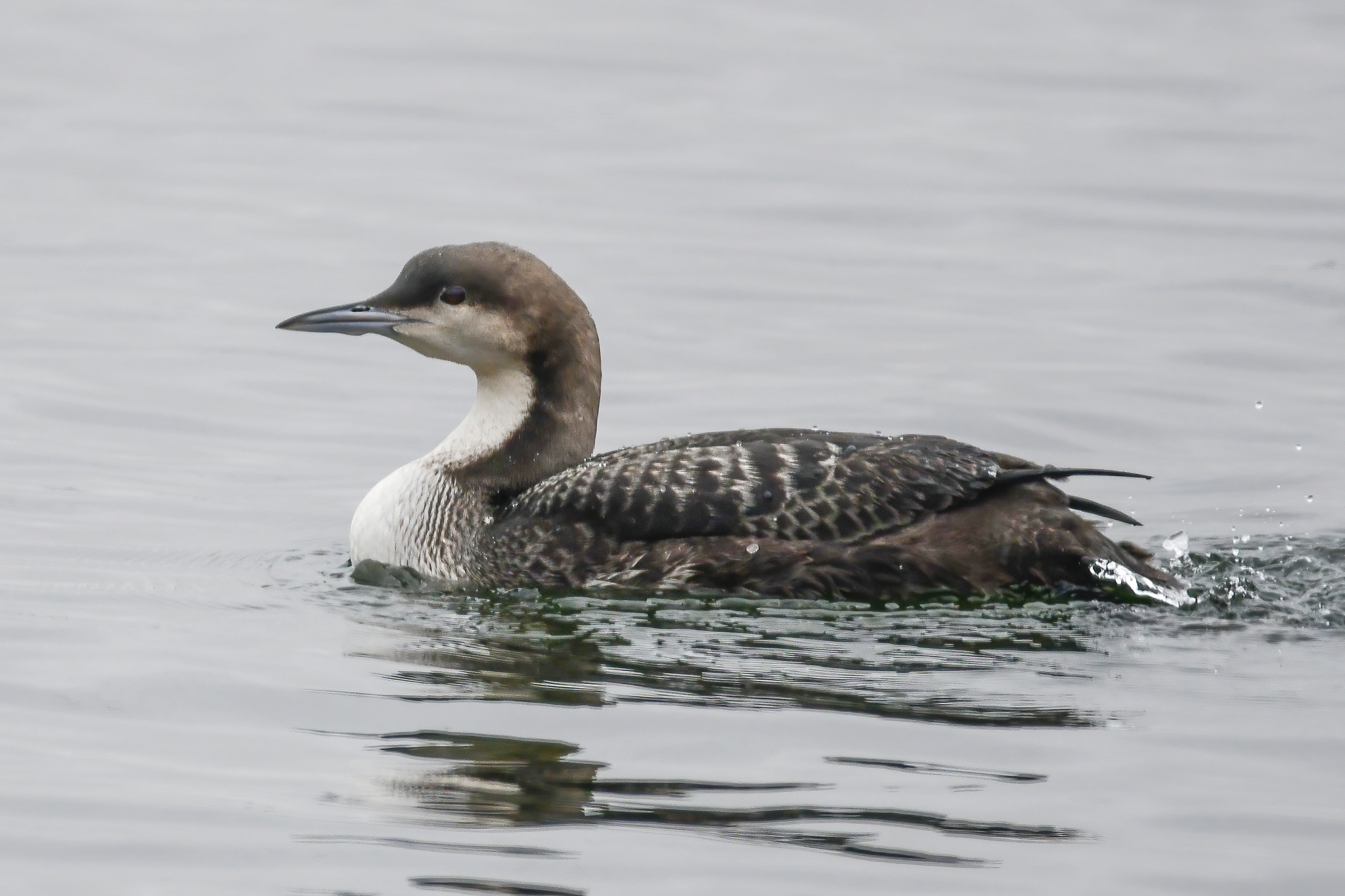
- Non-breeding plumage

Conservation status
- Least Concern (IUCN 3.1)

Scientific classification
- Kingdom: Animalia
- Phylum: Chordata
- Class: Aves
- Order: Gaviiformes
- Family: Gaviidae
- Genus: Gavia
- Species: G. pacifica

Binomial name
- Gavia pacifica (Lawrence, 1858)
- Range of the Pacific loon Breeding Non-breeding

= Pacific loon =

Species of bird

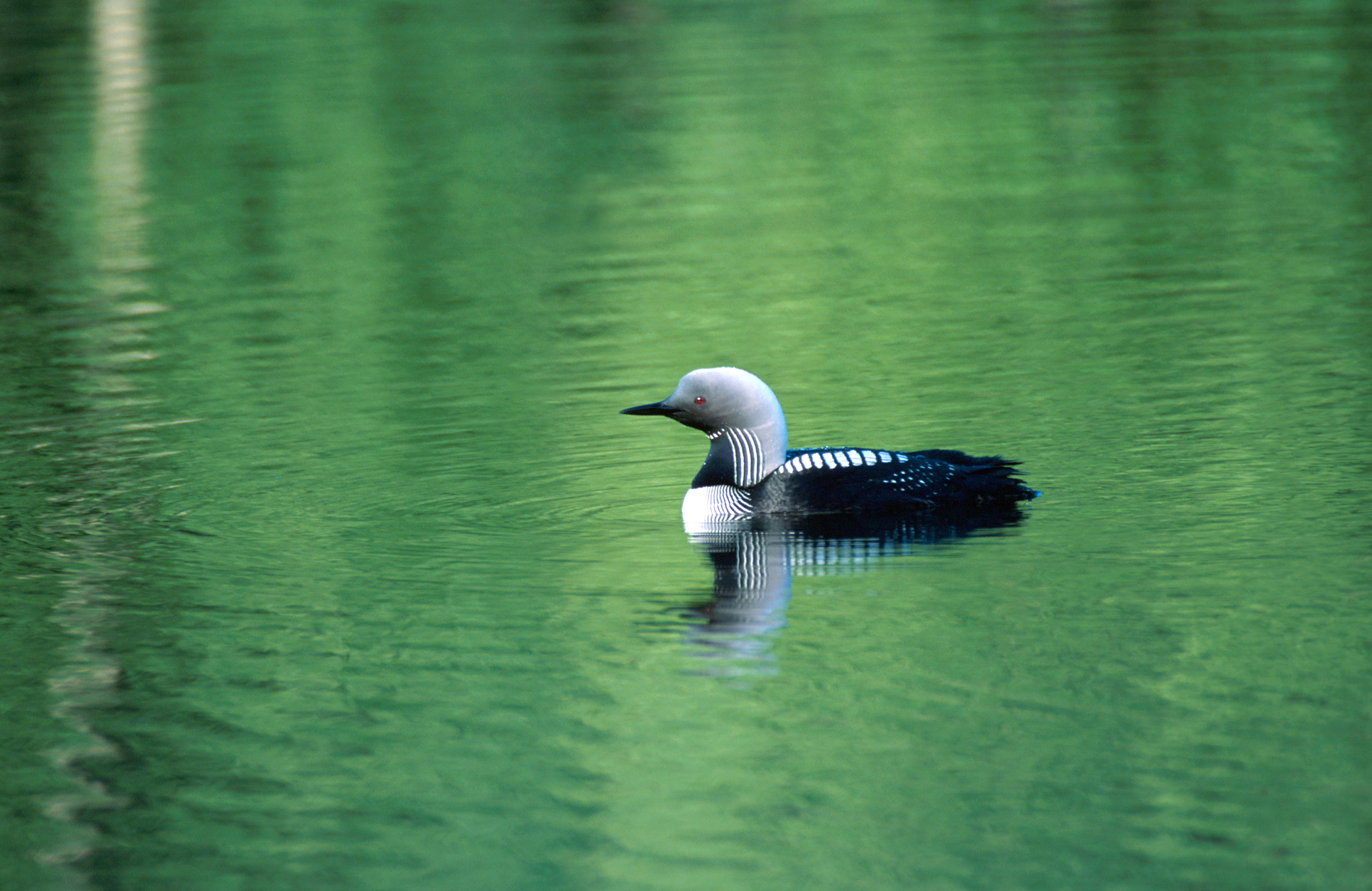
In Alaska

The Pacific loon or Pacific diver (Gavia pacifica) is a medium-sized member of the loon, or diver, family.

== Taxonomy and etymology ==
The Pacific loon, previously considered conspecific with the similar black-throated loon, was classified as a separate species in 1985. The genus name Gavia comes from the Latin for "sea mew", as used by ancient Roman naturalist Pliny the Elder. The specific epithet pacifica is Latin for the Pacific Ocean, the term meaning "peaceful".

The phylogeny of this species is debated, with the black-throated loon and the Pacific loon traditionally being considered sister species, whereas a study using mitochondrial and nuclear intron DNA supported placing the black-throated loon sister to a clade consisting of the Pacific loon and the two sister species that are the common loon and the yellow-billed loon. In the former phylogeny, the split between the Pacific loon and the black-throated loon is proposed to have happened about 6.5 million years ago.

== Description ==
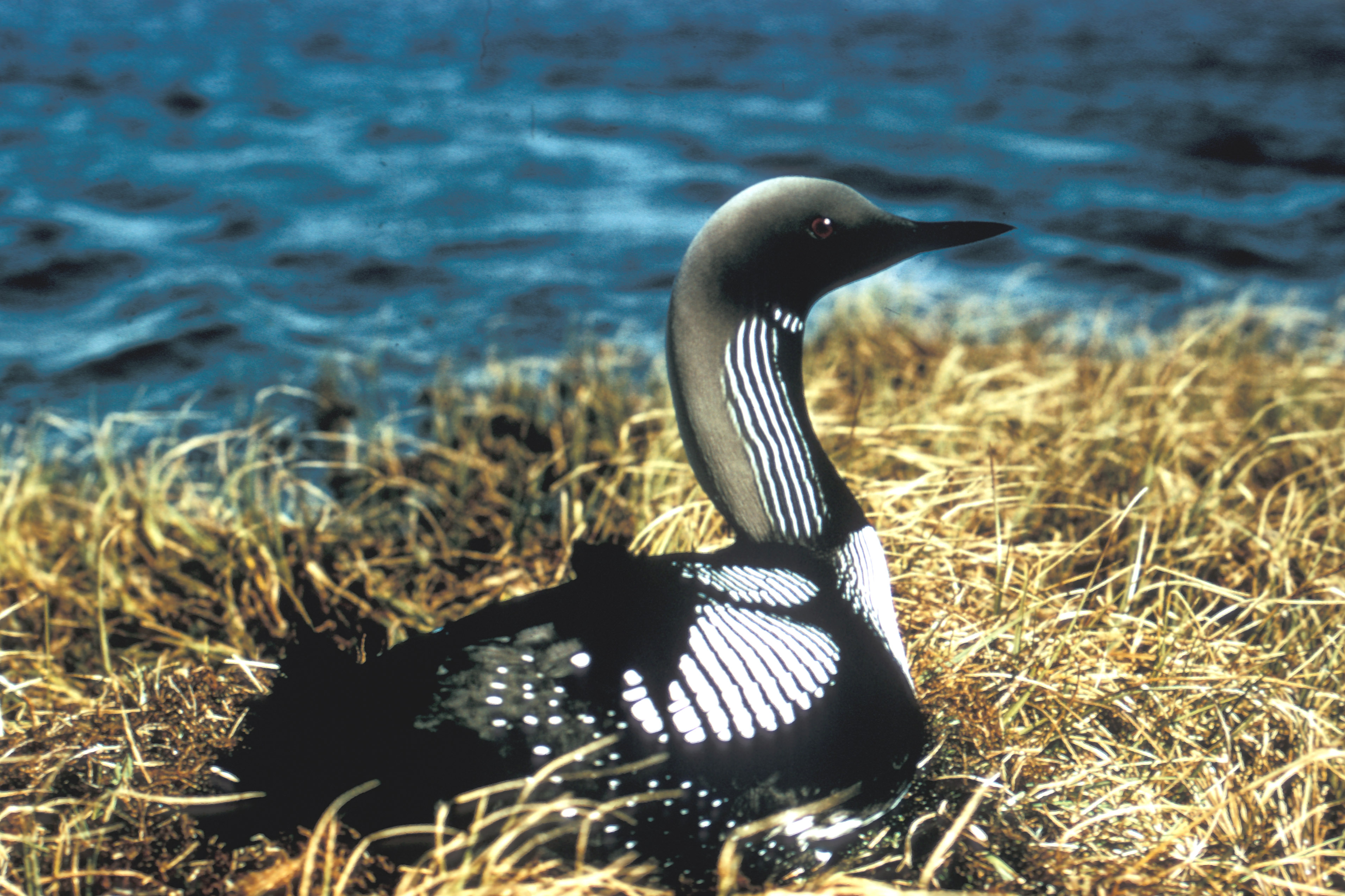
Pacific loon

Breeding adults are like a smaller sleeker version of common loon. They measure 58–74 cm (23–29 in) in length, 110–128 cm (43–50 in) in wingspan and weigh 1–2.5 kg (2.2–5.5 lb). They have a grey head, black throat, white underparts and chequered black-and-white mantle. The black throat has purple reflections. Non-breeding plumage is drabber with the chin and foreneck white. Its bill is grey or whitish and dagger-shaped.

In all plumages, lack of a white flank patch distinguishes this species from the otherwise very similar black-throated loon. The Pacific loon can be differentiated from the red-throated loon in winter by the latter's paler look, the fact that the red-throated loon has less of a contrast between both the crown and hindneck and the throat, and the bill that looks to be upturned.

Like other gaviiformes, the Pacific loon's legs are located towards the back of its body making it difficult for it to walk on land. The leg placement helps the loons efficiently forage for food underwater. The physiological structure of the Pacific loon makes taking off from land practically impossible, and the loon requires 30 to 50 yards (27 to 46 m) on the water to successfully attain flight. This distance requirement for takeoff limits the number of lakes the Pacific loon can realistically breed and forage on.

=== Calls ===
The Pacific loon most actively calls in the spring and summer and has a wide range of calls. When feeding, the Pacific loon may produce an "ark"-like vocalization, a sharp, short call. Additionally, the Pacific loon has a call similar to that of its relative the common loon, it is a loud, eerie, oo-loo-lee wail or yodel that can travel for miles and is typically heard during the loon's breeding season. The loons can also make short and harsh "kok-kok-kok-kok" calls along with a range of other smaller cackles, growls, barks, and clucking noises.

== Habitat and range ==
The Pacific loon breeds on tundra lakes, and winters in the open ocean or other large bodies of water. It breeds primarily in northern Canada and eastern Siberia, and winters along the Pacific coast of North America.

=== Movements ===
Unlike other loons/divers, this bird may migrate in flocks. It winters at sea, mainly on the Pacific coast, or on large lakes over a much wider range, including China, Japan, North Korea, South Korea, United States and Mexico. It has occurred as a vagrant to Greenland, Hong Kong, Great Britain, Spain, Sweden, Finland and Switzerland (Dec 2015).

== Behaviour ==
=== Breeding ===
Pacific loons begin mating behavior in spring and summer, displaying beak-dipping and splash-diving to attract mates, with males fighting using their beaks, potentially fatally. Once mates are established, the pair lives monogamously and finds a nesting lake where they build a nest on the shoreline. This mating pair will last as long as offspring are produced, often for life.

The Pacific loon constructs its nest on the ground near deep lakes. This nest is made out of piled-up vegetation and mud.

This loon lays a clutch of one to two light buff or green eggs with brown spots of various sizes. These eggs typically measure 76 by 47 millimetres (3.0 by 1.9 in). Although the eggs are laid a few days a part, they can usually be seen to hatch at intervals not more than a day apart. Incubation lasts 23 to 25 days.

Before chicks are able to fish independently, at around 8 weeks, they rely heavily on their parents for support. As a part of their care for the chicks, a parent will carry young on their back while swimming to protect the chicks from predation and cold.

=== Territoriality ===
Socially monogamous Pacific loons have been found to have high territory retention rates (0.92) indicating that the loons are able to successfully defend their nesting lake from other loon pairs or individuals who may be trying to move in. Furthermore, males have a greater success at territory retention than females, but no evidence suggests that this difference is attributed to size but is rather due to fighting ability or familiarity with territory.

Pacific loons prospecting for a new lake frequently visited lakes that were already occupied, this along with high retention rates of lakes indicates that the loon population in Northern Alaska may be saturated. The Pacific loon has also been known to be very aggressive, engaging in interspecific killing of both hatch year and after hatch year individuals who intentionally or accidentally approach the loon's nesting area.

A pair of Pacific loons will defend young as a parental unit in which one parent protects the nest or fledglings while the other parent aggressively attacks the perceived threat. If the threat is another animal on the water, the attacking loon will extend its head and neck in an aggressive manner and dive under the threat in an attempt to stab it with its beak as it resurfaces. Pacific loons are so aggressive, they have even been observed displaying threatening body language towards passing airplanes in Alaska.

=== Diet ===
This species, like all divers/loons, is a specialist fish-eater, catching its prey underwater. It also forages in groups, usually swimming under schools of fish and forcing them up towards the surface. It generally feeds closer to the shore than other loons.

== Conservation ==
The Pacific loon population is currently increasing and is spread over a wide range of approximately 15,700,000 square kilometers. Current efforts of conservation are focused on loon population monitoring and maintaining accurate counts of populations and breeding behaviors. A recent in-depth study of the Pacific loon population in the Western Alaskan Arctic found that the population of the birds there is actually ~1.5-2.0 times larger than previous aerial surveillance had indicated. The study indicated potential encroachment upon the National Petroleum Reserve in Alaska (NPRA), one of the Pacific loons' primary breeding grounds, by natural gas and oil companies as a potential threat to Pacific loons.

One harmful environmental pollutant to the Pacific loon population is heavy metals like mercury, which can be observed in their habitat as a result of legacy mining in the areas where loons migrate and hunt. It has been shown that elevated levels of mercury in the environment pose a significant health risk to avian piscivores like the Pacific loon. Mercury is absorbed by small fish, which are a primary food source for loons, possibly causing mercury poisoning.

Additionally, it has been shown that nest visits from researchers and capture events can have a significant impact on the survival rates within Pacific loon nests. When investigators capture Pacific loons while they are breeding or incubating eggs, regardless of how close they are to the nest at the time of capture, the survival rates of the eggs decrease.

Reports also exist of Pacific loons ingesting polluted plastic, a problem that is becoming an increasingly high concern among avians in Canada. The foraging behavior of loons while diving keeps them at a relatively low risk of death from overconsumption of plastic, as most of the polluted debris exists floating on the surface of the water, rather than at depths.

Climate change poses a threat to Pacific loon habitat, primarily due to water loss in the lakes where they breed.
