= Social monogamy in mammalian species =

Monogamy in mammals

Social monogamy in mammals is defined as sexually mature adult organisms living in pairs. While there are many definitions of social monogamy, this social organization can be found in invertebrates, reptiles and amphibians, fish, birds, and mammals, including humans.

It should not be confused with genetic monogamy, which refers to two individuals who only reproduce with one another. Social monogamy does not describe the sexual interactions or patterns of reproduction between monogamous pairs; rather it strictly refers to the patterns of their living conditions. Rather, sexual and genetic monogamy describe reproductive patterns. It is possible for a species to be both genetically monogamous and socially monogamous but it is more likely for species to practice social monogamy and not genetic monogamy. Social monogamy consists of, but is not limited to: sharing the same territory; obtaining food resources; and raising offspring together. A unique characteristic of monogamy is that unlike in polygamous species, parents share parenting tasks. Even though their tasks are shared, monogamy does not define the degree of paternal investment in the breeding of the young.

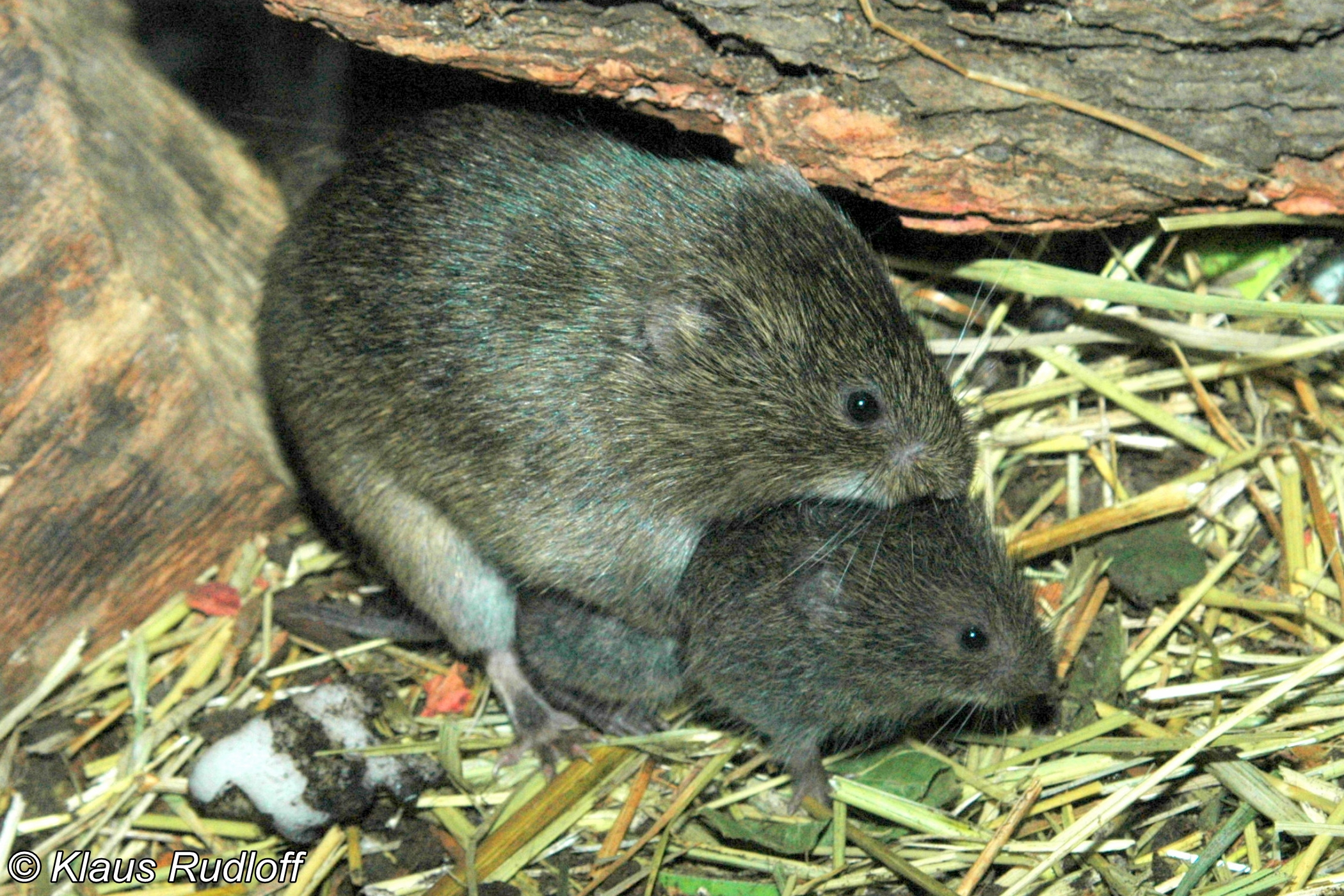
Pair of socially monogamous voles.

Only ~3–5% of all mammalian species are socially monogamous, including some species that mate for life and ones that mate for an extended period of time. Monogamy is more common among primates: about 29% of primate species are socially monogamous. Lifelong monogamy is very rare; however, it is exemplified by species such as the Prairie vole (Microtus ochrogaster). A vast majority of monogamous mammals practice serial social monogamy where another male or female is accepted into a new partnership in the case of a partner's death. In addition, there are some species that exhibit short-term monogamy which involves partnership termination while one's partner is still alive; however, it usually lasts for at least one breeding season. Monogamy usually does not occur in groups where there is a high abundance of females, but rather in ones where females occupy small ranges. Socially monogamous mammals live at significantly lower population densities than do solitary species. Additionally, most mammals exhibit male-biased dispersal; however, most monogamous mammalian species display female-biased dispersal. Some socially monogamous species exhibit pair bonds that occur between two sexually mature organisms, have an affective component, be specific to the individual, last longer that one reproductive cycle, and be quantifiable in strength or quality of relationship. Pair bonding can exhibit (but does not have to) sexual behaviors and/or bi-parental care. Pair bonding cannot exhibit, however, organisms that cannot identify one another in a pair, end in the death of a mate or separation from the mate directly after mating, lack of distress when separated from the mate, or lack sociality. Not all socially monogamous species exhibit pair bonding, but all pair bonding animals practice social monogamy. These characteristics aid in identifying a species as being socially monogamous.

At the biological level, social monogamy affects the neurobiology of the organism through hormone pathways such as vasopressin and oxytocin. Vasopressin is related to the distress hormone an organism feels when separated from their mate while oxytocin is associated with the affective component of the social interactions between mates. These biological factors give way to a genetic component that evolution could act on via selection to evolve social monogamy in animals.

== Types of social monogamy ==
=== Facultative monogamy ===
Facultative monogamy, or Type I monogamy, occurs when the male is not fully committed to one female, but he chooses to stay with her because there are no other mating opportunities available to him. In this type of monogamy, species rarely spend time with their families, and there is a lack of paternal care towards the offspring. Elephant shrews (Rhynchocyon chrysopygus and Elephantulus rufescens), Agoutis (Dasyprocta punctata), Grey duikers (Sylvicapra grimmia), and Pacaranas (Dinomys branickii) are some of the most common examples of the mammalian species that display Type I monogamy. In addition, these species are characterized to occupy low areas over a large expand of land.

=== Obligate monogamy ===
Obligate monogamy, or Type II monogamy, is practiced by species that live in overlapping territories, where females cannot rear their young without the help of their partners. Species such as Indris (Indri indri), Night monkeys (Aotus trivirgatus), African dormice (Notomys alexis), and Hutias (Capromys melanurus) are observed as family groups who live together with a number of generations of their young.

There are several factors that are associated with Type II monogamy:

- high paternal investment when offspring mature in the family setting
- delayed sexual maturation observed in juveniles that remain in the family group
- juveniles contributing greatly to the rearing of their siblings when retained in the family group.

== Group living ==
One of the key factors of monogamous pairings is group living. Advantages to living in groups include, but are not limited to:

- Susceptibility to predation: animals such as the common dwarf mongoose (Helogale parvula) and tamarin (such as Saguinus oedipus) may benefit from such group living by having alarm calls in response to an approaching predator.
- Food acquisition: it is considerably easier for animals to hunt in a group rather than by themselves. For this reason, mammals such as dwarf mongooses, marmosets and tamarins hunt in groups and share their food among their family members or members of the group.
- Localization of resources: in some species, such as Eurasian beaver (Castor fiber), localization of an adequate lodge area (a pond or a stream) is more beneficial in a group setting. This group living arrangement gives beavers a better chance to find a high quality place to live by searching for it in a group rather than by one individual.

These group living advantages, however, do not describe why monogamy, and not polygyny, has evolved in the species mentioned above. Some possible conditions which may account for cases of monogamous behavior in mammalian species may have to do with:

- scarce resources available on any given territory so that two or more individuals are needed in order to defend it
- physical environment conditions are so unfavorable that multiple individuals are needed to cope with it
- early breeding serves as an advantage to the species and is crucial to monogamous species.

== Evolution of monogamy ==
There are several hypotheses for the evolution of mammalian monogamy that have been extensively studied. While some of these hypotheses apply to a majority of monogamous species, other apply to a very limited number of them.

=== Proximate causes ===
==== Hormones and Neurotransmitters ====
Vasopressin is a hormone that induces a male Prairie vole to mate with one female, form a pair bond, and exhibit mate-guarding behavior (i.e. increase the degree of monogamous behavior). The presence of vasopressin receptor 1A (V1aR) in the ventral forebrain is associated with pair bonding, which is necessary for monogamy. Genetic differences in the V1aR gene also play a role in monogamy: voles with long V1aR alleles exhibit more monogamous tendencies by preferring their mate over a stranger of the opposite sex, whereas voles with short V1aR alleles displayed a lesser degree of partner preference. Vasopressin is responsible for forming attachment between male and female prairie voles. Vasopressin also regulates paternal care. Finally, vasopressin activity results in "postmating aggression" that allows prairie voles to protect their mate.

Oxytocin is a hormone that regulates pair bond formation along with vasopressin. Blocking either oxytocin or vasopressin prevents formation of the pair bond but continues to allow for social behavior. Blocking both hormones resulted in no pair bond and reduced sociality. Oxytocin also attenuates the negative effects of cortisol, a hormone related to stress, so that monogamy helps produce positive health effects. Male marmosets that received an oxytocin antagonist had increased HPA-axis activity in response to a stressor than when treated with a control, showing the oxytocin associated with the pair bond lessens the physiological responses to stress. Also, marmosets who previously had elevated cortisol levels spent more time in close proximity to their mate than marmosets with previously normal cortisol levels.

Dopamine, a neurotransmitter, produces pleasurable effects that reinforce monogamous behavior. Haloperidol, a dopamine antagonist, prevented partner preference but did not disrupt mating while apomorphine, a dopamine agonist, induced pair bonding without mating, showing dopamine is necessary for the formation of the pair bond in prairie voles. In addition, mating induced a 33% increase in turnover of dopamine in the nucleus accumbens. While this result was not statistically significant, it may indicate that mating can induce pair bond formation via the dopaminergic reward system.

Elevated testosterone levels are associated with decreased paternal behavior and decreased testosterone levels are associated with decreased rates of infanticide. Experienced Marmoset fathers had decreased testosterone levels after exposure to their 2-week-old infant's scent but not their 3-month-old infant's or a stranger infant's, suggesting offspring-specific olfactory signals can regulate testosterone and induce paternal behavior.

=== Ultimate causes ===
==== Female distribution ====
Female distribution seems to be one of the best predictors of the evolution of monogamy in some species of mammals. It is possible that monogamy evolved due to a low female availability or high female dispersion where males were unable to monopolize more than one mate over a period of time. In species such as Kirk's dik-dik (Madoqua kirkii) and Rufous elephant shrew (Elephantulus rufescens), biparental care is not very common. These species do, however, exhibit monogamous mating systems presumably due to high dispersal rates. Komers and Brotherton (1997) indicated that there is a significant correlation between mating systems and grouping patterns in these species. Furthermore, monogamous mating system and female dispersion are found to be closely related. Some of the main conclusions of the occurrence of monogamy in mammals include:

- Monogamy occurs when males are unable to monopolize more than one female
- Monogamy should be more likely if female under-dispersion occurs
- Female home range is larger for monogamous species
- When females are solitary and occupy large ranges

This phenomenon is not common for all species, but species such as the Japanese serow (Capricornis crispus) exhibits this behavior, for example.

==== Bi-parental care ====
It is believed that bi-parental care had an important role in the evolution of monogamy. Because mammalian females undergo periods of gestation and lactation, they are well adapted to take care of their young for a long period of time, as opposed to their male partners who do not necessarily contribute to this rearing process. Such differences in parental contribution could be a result of the male's drive to seek other females in order to increase their reproductive success, which may prevent them from spending extra time helping raise their offspring. Helping a female in young rearing could potentially jeopardize a male's fitness and result in the loss of mating opportunities. There are some monogamous species that exhibit this type of care mainly to improve their offspring's survivorship; however it does not occur in more than 5% of all mammals.

Bi-parental care has been extensively studied in the California deermouse (Peromyscus californicus). This species of mice is known to be strictly monogamous; mates pair for a long period of time, and the level of extra-pair paternity is considerably low. It has been shown that in the event of female removal, it is the male that takes direct care of the offspring and acts as the primary hope for the survival of his young. Females who attempt to raise their young in cases where their mate is removed often do not succeed due to high maintenance costs that have to do with raising an offspring. With the presence of males, the survival of the offspring is much more probable; thus, it is in the best interest for both parents to contribute. This concept also applies to other species, ilike the Fat-tailed dwarf lemurs (Cheirogaleus medius), where females were also not successful at raising their offspring without paternal help. Lastly, in a study performed by Wynne-Edwards (1987), 95% of Campbell's dwarf hamsters (Phodopus campbelli) survived in the presence of both parents, but only 47% survived if the father was removed. There are several key factors that may affect the extent to which males care for their young:

- Intrinsic ability to aid offspring: the male's ability to exhibit parental care.
- Sociality: male paternal behavior shaped by permanent group living. There is a closer association between the male and his offspring in small groups that are often composed of individuals that are genetically related. Common examples include mongooses, wolves, and naked mole-rats.
- High costs to polygyny: some males could evolve to care for their offspring in cases where females were too dispersed over the given territory and the male could not find consistent females to mate with. In those territories, individuals such as elephant shrews, and dasyproctids, stay within their known territories rather than going outside of their limits in order to search for another mate, which would be more costly than staying around his adapted territory.
- Paternity certainty: There are cases where males care for offspring that they are not genetically related to especially in groups where cooperative breeding is practiced. However, in some species, males are able to identify their own offspring, especially in threat of infanticide. In these groups, paternity certainty could be a factor deciding about biparental care.

==== Infanticide ====
In primates, it is thought that risk of infanticide is the primary driver for the evolution of socially monogamous relationships. Primates are unusual in that 25% of all species are socially monogamous; additionally, this trait has evolved separately in every major clade. Primates also experience higher rates of infanticide than most other animals, with infanticide rates as high as 63% in some species. Opie, Atkinson, Dunbar, & Shutlz (2013) found strong evidence that male infanticide preceded the evolutionary switch to social monogamy in primates rather than bi-parental care or female distribution, suggesting that infanticide is the main cause for the evolution of social monogamy in primates. This is consistent with the findings that indicate that the percentage of infant loss is significantly lower in monogamous than in polyandrous species.

Due to the length of gestation and lactation in female mammals, infanticide, the killing of the offspring by adult individuals, is relatively common in this group. Since there is a strong male to male competition for reproduction in species with this behaviour, infanticide could be an adaptative strategy to enhance fitness if:

- the male only kills unrelated infants.
- the male's chance of siring the next offspring is high.
- the female could benefit from killing other female's offspring by reducing future competition for food or shelter.

The rates of infanticide are very low in other monogamous groups of larger mammals.

== Evolutionary consequences ==
The forementioned ultimate causes of monogamy in mammals can have phenotypic consequences on the sexual size dimorphism of mammals. In other words, it is thought that in monogamous species males would tend to have a similar or lower body size to the one of females. This is because males from monogamous species do not compete as strongly with each other, hence investing in greater physical abilities would be costlier for males. Comparatively, we can conclude that sexual dimorphism is reduced in long-term pair bonding species, by observing that polygynous species tend to have a greater sexual size dimorphism.
