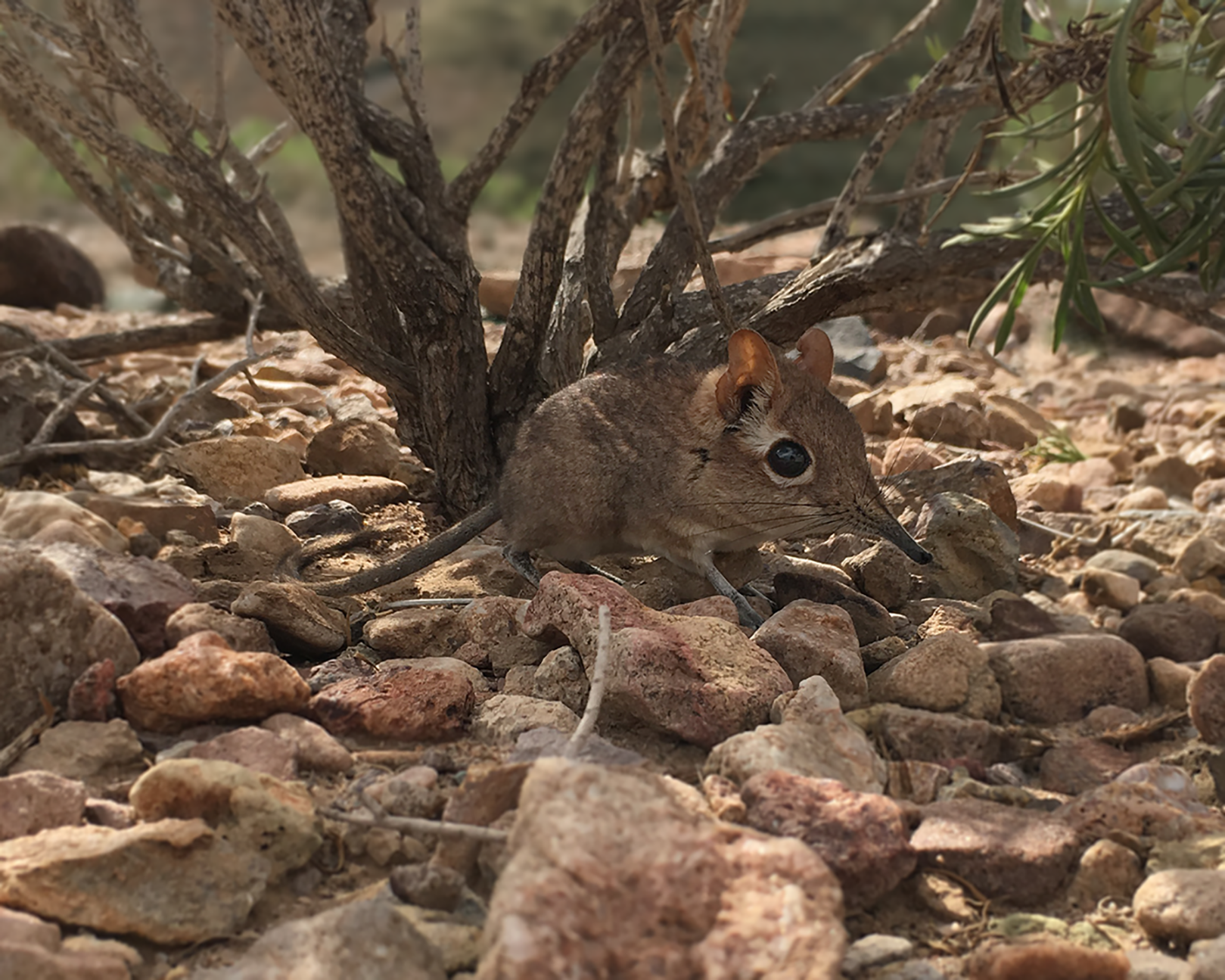
- Somali sengi (G. revoilii)

Scientific classification
- Kingdom: Animalia
- Phylum: Chordata
- Class: Mammalia
- Infraclass: Placentalia
- Order: Macroscelidea
- Family: Macroscelididae
- Genus: Galegeeska; Heritage & Rayaleh, 2020

Type species
- Galegeeska revoilii (Hüet, 1881)

Species
- G. revoilii G. rufescens
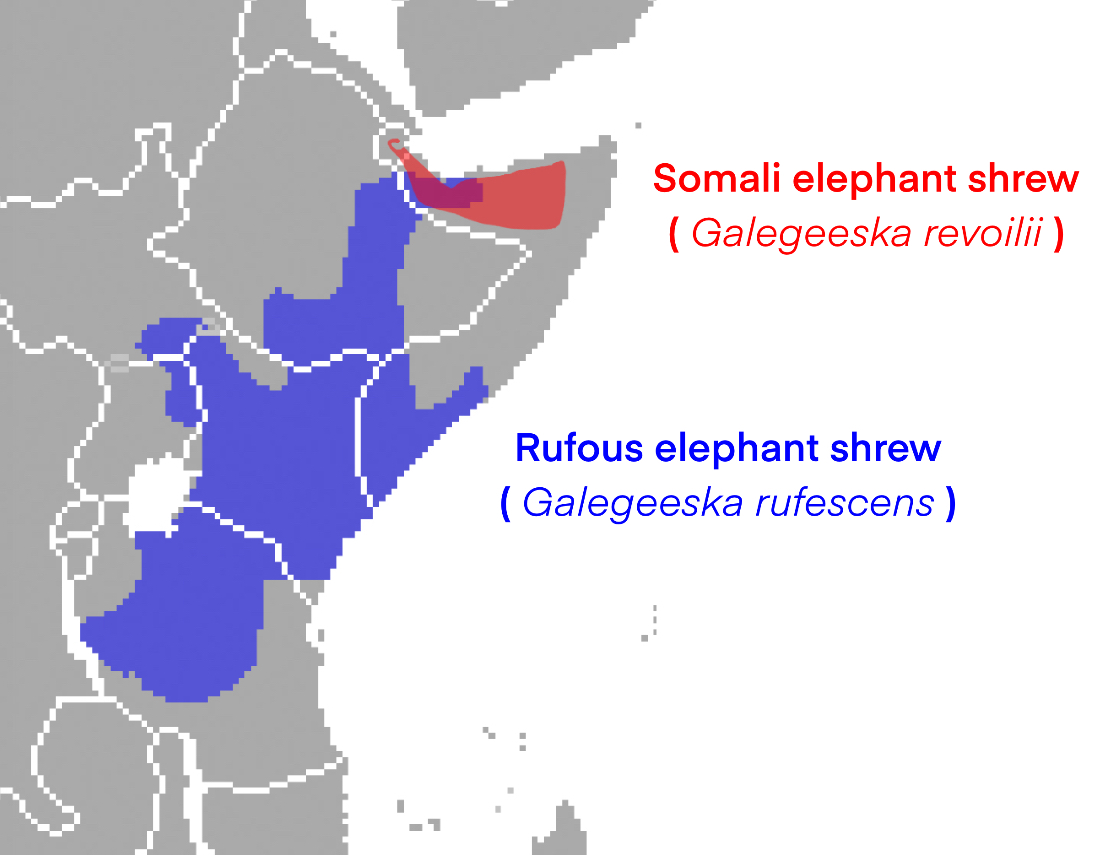

= Galegeeska =

Genus of sengi

Galegeeska is a genus of sengi (or elephant shrew) in the family Macroscelididae.

Members in this genus were formerly classified in the genus Elephantulus, but later studies found the Somali and rufous sengis to be the sister taxa of the clade containing the genera Petrodromus and Petrosaltator; due to this, the genus Galegeeska was coined for the Somali and later the rufous sengi. The split with the Petrodromus-Petrosaltator clade is estimated to have occurred about 20.6 million years ago.

Galegeeska translates to "weasel of the horn". In the Somali language, geeska means corner or horn, as in the Horn of Africa. Galê in Ancient Greek means weasel, and has been used in other small mammal taxa. 'Gale' also honours one of the authors, Galen B. Rathbun (1944-2019) who searched for the Somali sengi and devoted several decades of research into sengi biology.

It contains two species;

- Somali sengi, Galegeeska revoilii
- Rufous sengi, Galegeeska rufescens

Research of the Galegeeska genus shows three specific traits (apomorphies) that are unique to the Galegeeska. These three traits includes specifically hairy rhinarium below, fully developed pectoral gland, and y-shaped sulci of the dorsal openings of the stapedial artery. The Galegeeska also tend to have an absence of bicolored tail where the Gelegeeska revoilii have a white tail and the Galegeeska rufescens have a dark brown tail.
