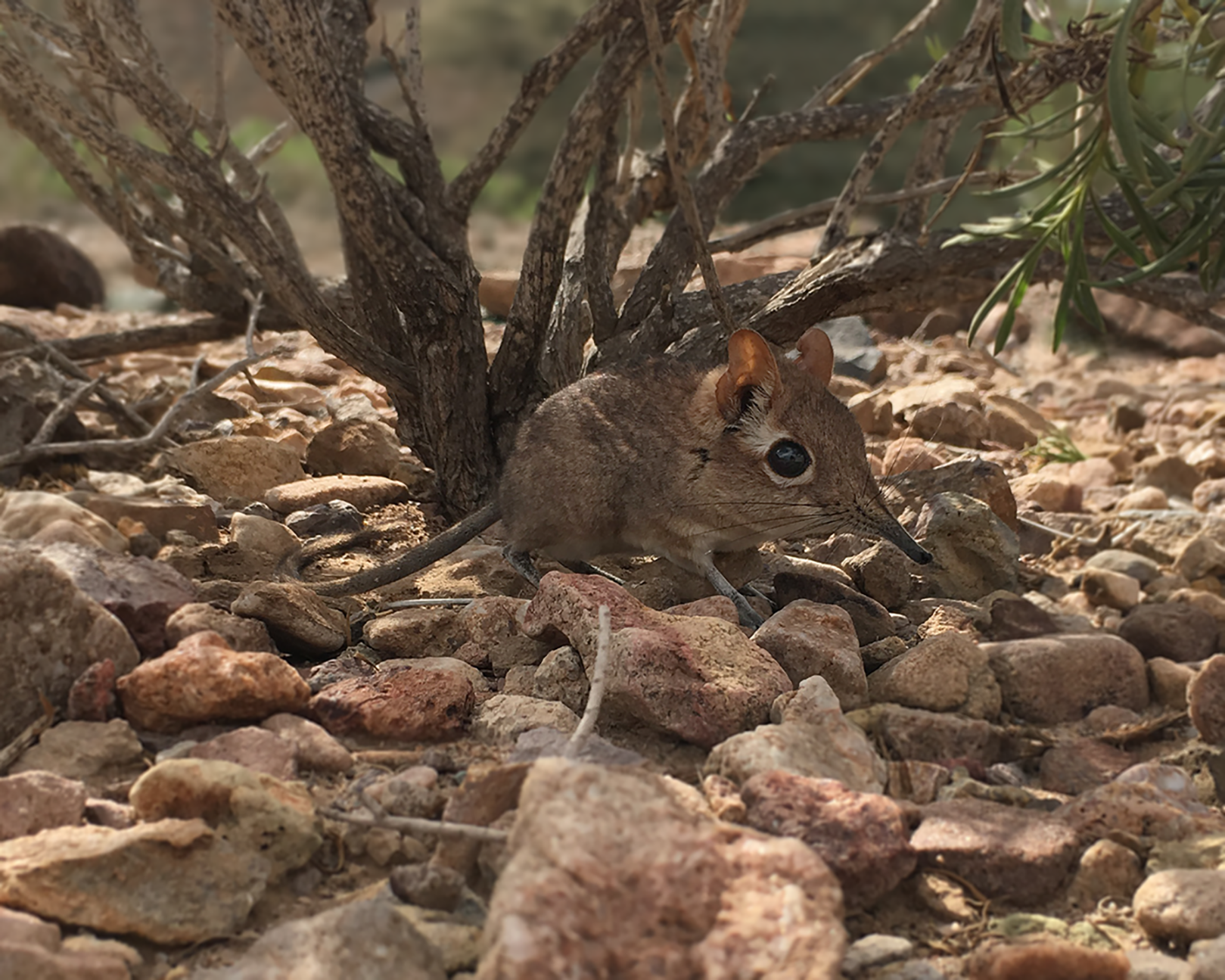

Conservation status
- Data Deficient (IUCN 3.1)

Scientific classification
- Kingdom: Animalia
- Phylum: Chordata
- Class: Mammalia
- Order: Macroscelidea
- Family: Macroscelididae
- Genus: Galegeeska
- Species: G. revoilii

Binomial name
- Galegeeska revoilii (Hüet, 1881)
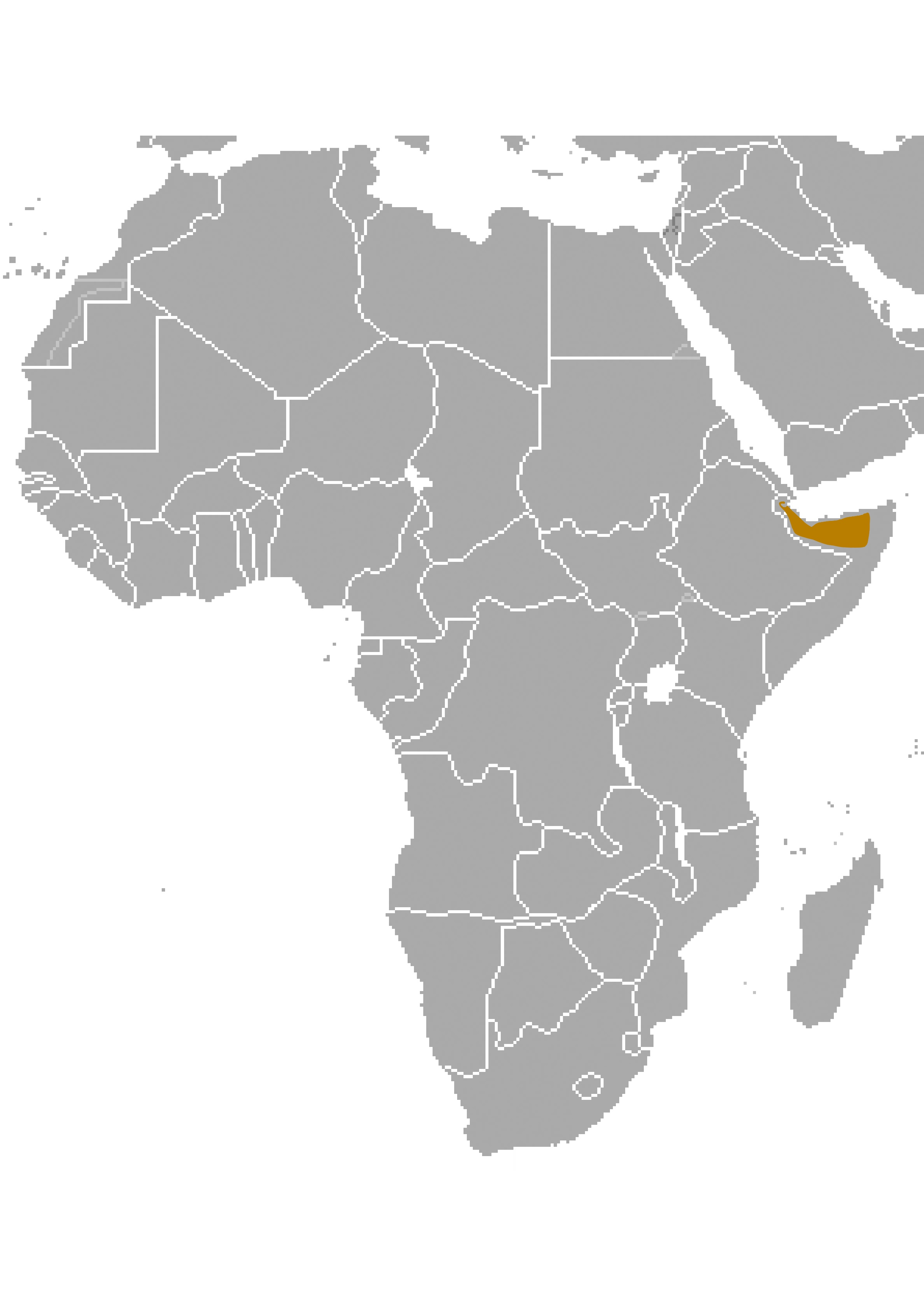

Synonyms
- Elephantulus revoilii Elephantulus revoili Macroscelides revoilii Huet, 1881

= Somali sengi =

Small animal of northeast Africa

The Somali sengi or Somali elephant shrew (Galegeeska revoilii) is a species of small mammal belonging to the sengi family (Macroscelididae).

== Habitat ==
Its natural habitat is arid and semiarid desert with rocky substrates and sparse shrubs. In some parts of Somalia, the Somali sengi and rufous sengi (G. rufescens) may be locally sympatric. It is found in the northern Horn of Africa; it was formerly thought to be exclusively endemic to Somalia, but a 2020 sighting also indicates they are found in Djibouti and potentially Ethiopia.

== Classification ==
It was formerly classified in the genus Elephantulus, but a 2020 study found it to be the sister taxon of the clade containing the genera Petrodromus and Petrosaltator; and the genus Galegeeska was coined for it.

== Disappearance and rediscovery ==
The Somali sengi was among the 25 "most wanted lost" species that were the focus of Global Wildlife Conservation's "Search for Lost Species" initiative. On 18 August 2020, 50 years after it was last seen and recorded, it was announced that a population had been found in Djibouti, the first documented since 1968. However, an analysis of ancestral biogeography shows that the Somali Sengi have inhabited the Horn of Africa for more than 5.4 million years.

== In media ==
=== Documentary ===
In 2026, the species made its television debut in the National Geographic documentary series Africa: Earth’s Wild Home (2026).
