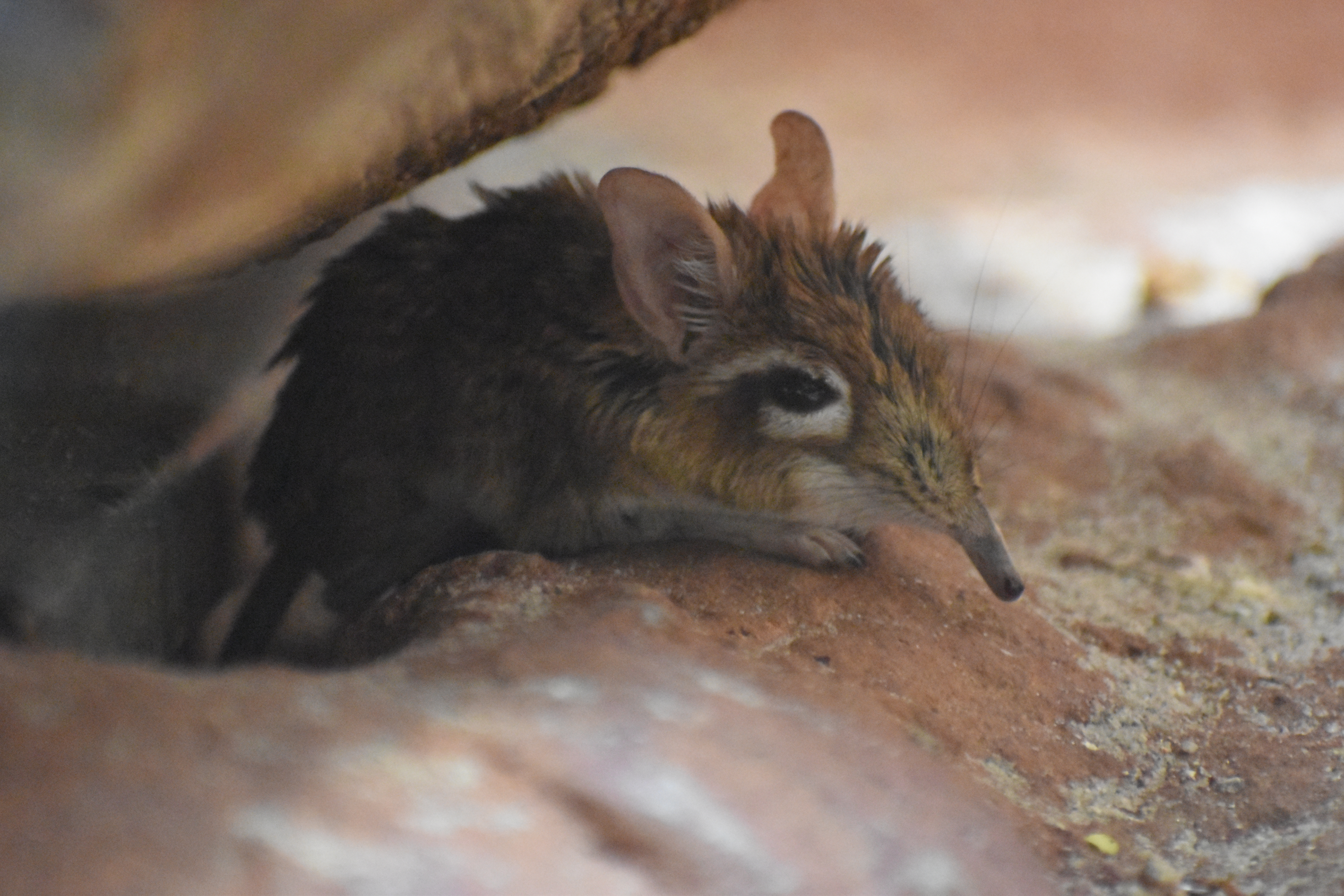
- Rufous sengi at the Frankfurt Zoological Garden

Conservation status
- Least Concern (IUCN 3.1)

Scientific classification
- Kingdom: Animalia
- Phylum: Chordata
- Class: Mammalia
- Infraclass: Placentalia
- Order: Macroscelidea
- Family: Macroscelididae
- Genus: Galegeeska
- Species: G. rufescens

Binomial name
- Galegeeska rufescens (Peters, 1878)
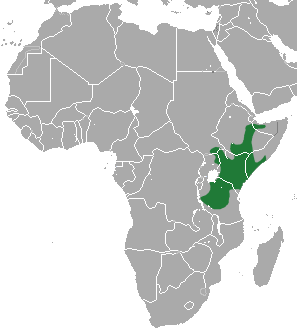
- Rufous sengi range

Synonyms
- Elephantulus rufescens

= Rufous sengi =

Species of mammal

The rufous sengi or rufuous elephant shrew (Galegeeska rufescens), also known as the East African long-eared sengi or East African long-eared elephant shrew, is a species of small mammal belonging to the sengi family (Macroscelididae). Found in Ethiopia, Kenya, Somalia, South Sudan, Tanzania and Uganda, its natural habitats are dry savanna and subtropical or tropical dry shrubland.

== Taxonomy ==
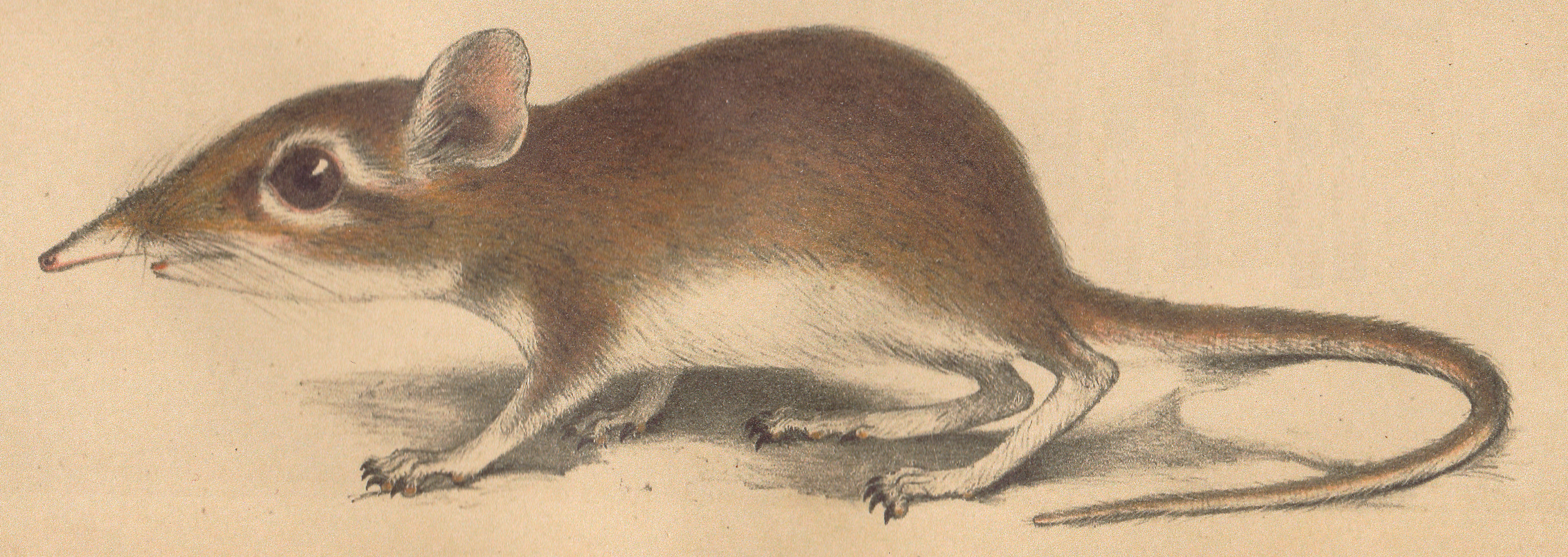
Illustration

Previous classified in the genus Elephantulus, a 2021 study found it to belong to the genus Galegeeska, which had been coined the previous year as a monotypic genus containing the then-rediscovered Somali sengi (G. revoilii). The American Society of Mammalogists has accepted these results.

== Distribution ==
Galegeeska rufescens occupies the drywood land and grassland zone of East Africa.

== Characteristics ==
Galegeeska rufescens exhibits no sexual dimorphism. The proboscis is long and flexible. The species' tails are dark-brown and can be long up to its head-to-tail length. Both adults and juveniles are similar in color. The dorsal fur is of fine texture and the coloring is brown, reddish-brown in color, or buff while the ventral fur coloring is white. The coloration of the dorsal fur is influenced by the color of the soil in which G. rufescens lives. However, adults have white feet while juveniles' feet are brown. The large eye is surrounded by a white ring which is interrupted by a dark patch which extended towards the rear of the animal. The ears are large and without fur. A sternal gland is present on both males and females. The sternal gland is indicated by short, fringed white hairs. Females have three pair of teats and the males have internal testes.

== Ecology, diet, and behavior ==
Rufous sengis are active throughout the day, with peaks in activity at dusk and dawn while having a midday rest. A mating male and female will build trails beneath leaf litter. The trails act as shelter and protection because the rufous sengi does not build or use shelters or burrows. Throughout the trails are several rest spots for scent-marking and sunbathing. Moving the forefoot laterally to push aside leaf litter and other loose debris, G. rufescens constructs and maintains trails. The males usually spend most of their time cleaning the foraging trails. Except for foraging, all activities are performed in these trails. Trails act as an important means for escaping from predators. Insects form the major food resource of their diet in the dry season, while seeds are consumed during periods of rain.

G. rufescens has not been observed sleeping with closed eyes, but has been observed resting with eyes partially closed for a period of 1 – 2 minutes. During these rest periods, which occur in rest spot along the trails, G. rufescens keeps their feet under their body to allow for a quick escape. This species takes flight when even the smallest noise is heard.

This species is fairly monogamous; however, members of a monogamous pair spend little time together and are limited in social interaction. They live in a matriarchal society in which the female of the pair usually dominates the male.

The rufous sengi gives birth to one or two precocial young per litter. The female gives birth at the base of bushes or by fallen tree limbs beside the trails. She does not stay will the neonates and only nurses them in infrequently and for only a short amount of time. The neonates remain in the parental trails, expanding their familiarity of the parental territory up to 14 days after birth. If the young wander into any neighboring rufous sengi trails, the residing residents chase them out of their trails. Before the next litter is born, parents chase the previous litter for the trails resulting in dispersal or death of the previous litter.

Olfactory communication between young G. rufescens and their parents is achieved through apocrine glands (pedal glands) located on the underside of the young's feet. Neonates less than five days old have been observed back-rubbing one of its parents. Parents crouch down, allowing the neonates to climb on their backs and vigorously rub their four feet in the fur in a rapid vibrating motion. Cooperation between the neonates and adults is necessary or the neonates will fall off. The act of back-rubbing allows neonates to deposit pedal gland products on the fur of the parents and in turn transfer parental odors to their own fur. The mixture of the scents creates a family odor that can be used for recognizing family members.
