= List of mammals of Djibouti =

This is a list of the mammal species recorded in Djibouti. Of the mammal species in Djibouti, one is critically endangered, another is endangered, five are vulnerable, and two are near threatened.

The following tags are used to highlight each species' conservation status as assessed by the International Union for Conservation of Nature:

| EX | Extinct | No reasonable doubt that the last individual has died. |
| EW | Extinct in the wild | Known only to survive in captivity or as a naturalized populations well outside its previous range. |
| CR | Critically endangered | The species is in imminent risk of extinction in the wild. |
| EN | Endangered | The species is facing an extremely high risk of extinction in the wild. |
| VU | Vulnerable | The species is facing a high risk of extinction in the wild. |
| NT | Near threatened | The species does not meet any of the criteria that would categorise it as risking extinction but it is likely to do so in the future. |
| LC | Least concern | There are no current identifiable risks to the species. |
| DD | Data deficient | There is inadequate information to make an assessment of the risks to this species. |

Some species were assessed using an earlier set of criteria. Species assessed using this system have the following instead of near threatened and least concern categories:

| LR/cd | Lower risk/conservation dependent | Species which were the focus of conservation programmes and may have moved into a higher risk category if that programme was discontinued. |
| LR/nt | Lower risk/near threatened | Species which are close to being classified as vulnerable but are not the subject of conservation programmes. |
| LR/lc | Lower risk/least concern | Species for which there are no identifiable risks. |

== Order: Tubulidentata (aardvarks) ==
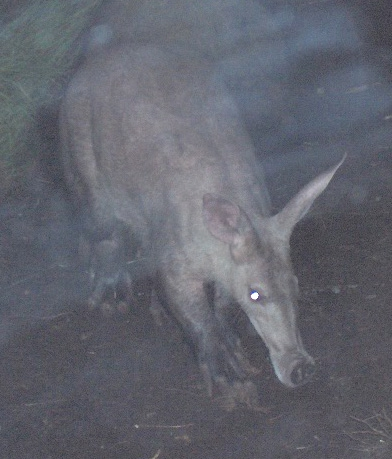
Aardvark

The order Tubulidentata consists of a single species, the aardvark. Tubulidentata are characterised by their teeth which lack a pulp cavity and form thin tubes which are continuously worn down and replaced.

- Family: Orycteropodidae
  - Genus: Orycteropus
    - Aardvark, Orycteropus afer LC

== Order: Sirenia (manatees and dugongs) ==
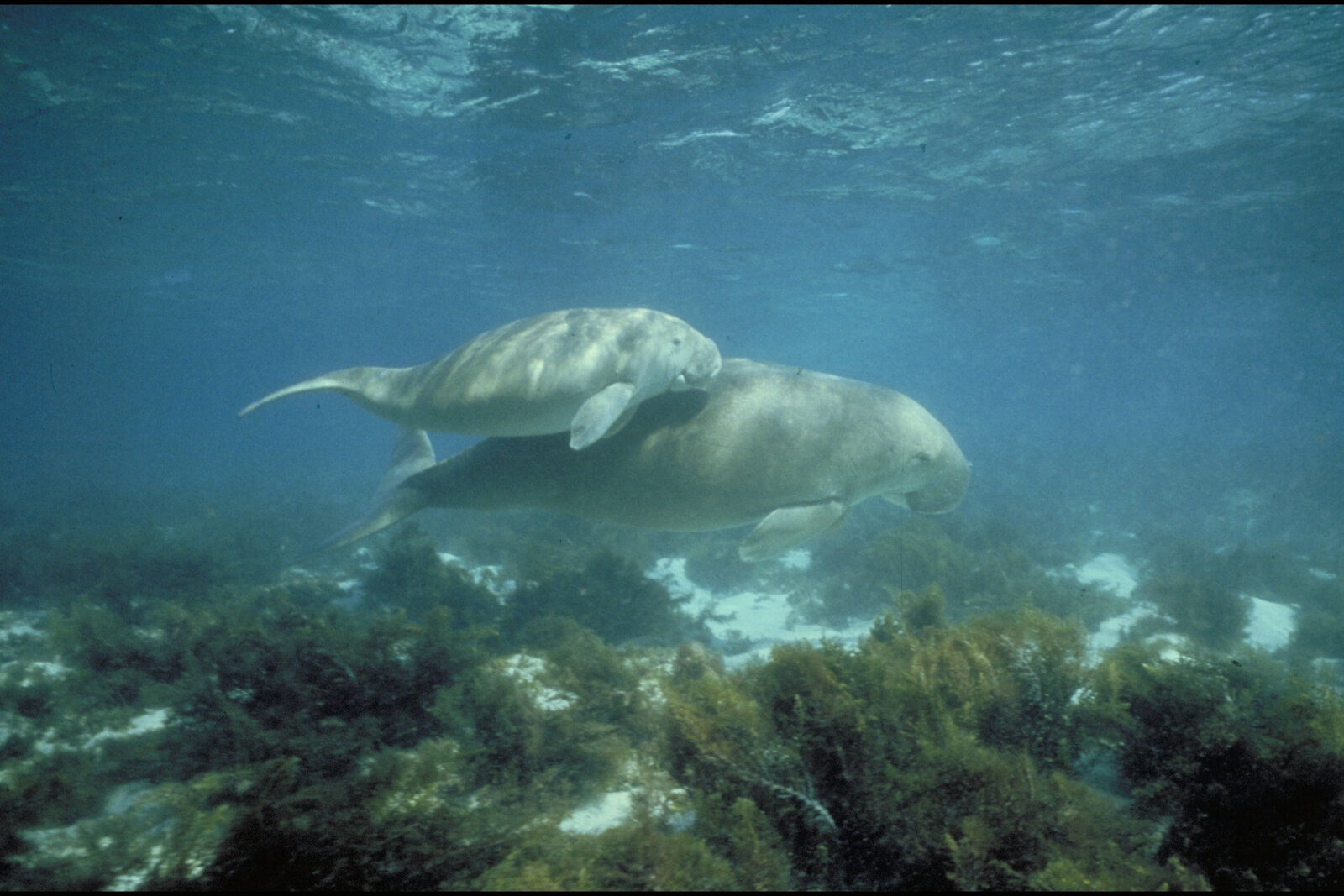
Dugongs

Sirenia is an order of fully aquatic, herbivorous mammals that inhabit rivers, estuaries, coastal marine waters, swamps, and marine wetlands. All four species are endangered.

- Family: Dugongidae
  - Genus: Dugong
    - Dugong, Dugong dugon VU

== Order: Primates ==
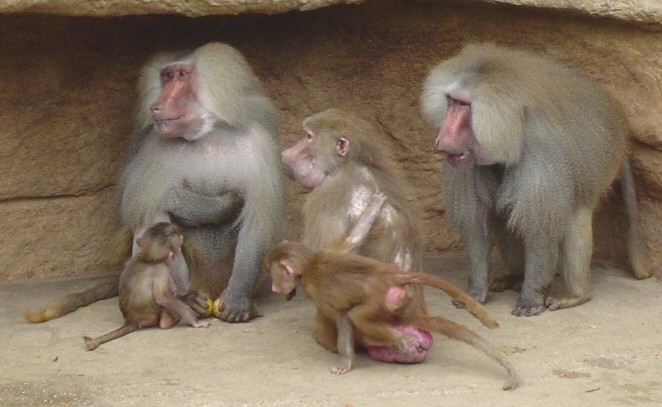
Hamadryas baboon

The order Primates contains humans and their closest relatives: lemurs, lorisoids, tarsiers, monkeys, and apes.

- Suborder: Strepsirrhini
  - Infraorder: Lemuriformes
    - Superfamily: Lorisoidea
      - Family: Galagidae
        - Genus: Galago
          - Senegal bushbaby, Galago senegalensis LR/lc
- Suborder: Haplorhini
  - Infraorder: Simiiformes
    - Parvorder: Catarrhini
      - Superfamily: Cercopithecoidea
        - Family: Cercopithecidae (Old World monkeys)
          - Genus: Papio
            - Hamadryas baboon, Papio hamadryas LR/nt

== Order: Rodentia (rodents) ==
Rodents make up the largest order of mammals, with over 40% of mammalian species. They have two incisors in the upper and lower jaw which grow continually and must be kept short by gnawing. Most rodents are small though the capybara can weigh up to 45 kg (99 lb).

- Suborder: Hystricognathi
  - Family: Bathyergidae
    - Genus: Heterocephalus
      - Naked mole-rat, Heterocephalus glaber LC
- Suborder: Sciurognathi
  - Family: Sciuridae (squirrels)
    - Subfamily: Xerinae
      - Tribe: Xerini
        - Genus: Xerus
          - Unstriped ground squirrel, Xerus rutilus LC
  - Family: Cricetidae
    - Subfamily: Lophiomyinae
      - Genus: Lophiomys
        - Maned rat, Lophiomys imhausi LC
  - Family: Muridae (mice, rats, voles, gerbils, hamsters, etc.)
    - Subfamily: Deomyinae
      - Genus: Acomys
        - Cairo spiny mouse, Acomys cahirinus LC
        - Louise's spiny mouse, Acomys louisae LC
        - Mullah spiny mouse, Acomys mullah LC
    - Subfamily: Gerbillinae
      - Genus: Gerbillus
        - Somalia gerbil, Gerbillus dunni DD
        - Somalian gerbil, Gerbillus somalicus DD
        - Waters's gerbil, Gerbillus watersi LC
  - Family: Ctenodactylidae
    - Genus: Pectinator
      - Speke's pectinator, Pectinator spekei DD

== Order: Lagomorpha (lagomorphs) ==
The lagomorphs comprise two families, Leporidae (hares and rabbits), and Ochotonidae (pikas). Though they can resemble rodents, and were classified as a superfamily in that order until the early 20th century, they have since been considered a separate order. They differ from rodents in a number of physical characteristics, such as having four incisors in the upper jaw rather than two.

- Family: Leporidae (rabbits, hares)
  - Genus: Lepus
    - Cape hare, Lepus capensis LR/lc

== Order: Erinaceomorpha (hedgehogs and gymnures) ==
The order Erinaceomorpha contains a single family, Erinaceidae, which comprise the hedgehogs and gymnures. The hedgehogs are easily recognised by their spines while gymnures look more like large rats.

- Family: Erinaceidae (hedgehogs)
  - Subfamily: Erinaceinae
    - Genus: Hemiechinus
      - Desert hedgehog, Hemiechinus aethiopicus LR/lc

== Order: Soricomorpha (shrews, moles, and solenodons) ==
The "shrew-forms" are insectivorous mammals. The shrews and solenodons closely resemble mice while the moles are stout-bodied burrowers.

- Family: Soricidae (shrews)
  - Subfamily: Crocidurinae
    - Genus: Crocidura
      - Savanna shrew, Crocidura fulvastra LC

== Order: Chiroptera (bats) ==
The bats' most distinguishing feature is that their forelimbs are developed as wings, making them the only mammals capable of flight. Bat species account for about 20% of all mammals.

- Family: Pteropodidae (flying foxes, Old World fruit bats)
  - Subfamily: Pteropodinae
    - Genus: Eidolon
      - Straw-coloured fruit bat, Eidolon helvum LC
- Family: Vespertilionidae
  - Subfamily: Vespertilioninae
    - Genus: Eptesicus
      - Botta's serotine, Eptesicus bottae LC
    - Genus: Neoromicia
      - Cape serotine, Neoromicia capensis LC
    - Genus: Nycticeinops
      - Schlieffen's bat, Nycticeinops schlieffeni LC
    - Genus: Scotophilus
      - African yellow bat, Scotophilus dinganii LC
- Family: Rhinopomatidae
  - Genus: Rhinopoma
    - Egyptian mouse-tailed bat, R. cystops LC
    - Lesser mouse-tailed bat, Rhinopoma hardwickei LC
    - Greater mouse-tailed bat, Rhinopoma microphyllum LC
- Family: Molossidae
  - Genus: Chaerephon
    - Spotted free-tailed bat, Chaerephon bivittata LC
    - Little free-tailed bat, Chaerephon pumila LC
  - Genus: Otomops
    - Large-eared free-tailed bat, Otomops martiensseni NT
- Family: Emballonuridae
  - Genus: Coleura
    - African sheath-tailed bat, Coleura afra LC
  - Genus: Taphozous
    - Naked-rumped tomb bat, Taphozous nudiventris LC
    - Egyptian tomb bat, Taphozous perforatus LC
- Family: Nycteridae
  - Genus: Nycteris
    - Egyptian slit-faced bat, Nycteris thebaica LC
- Family: Megadermatidae
  - Genus: Cardioderma
    - Heart-nosed bat, Cardioderma cor LC
- Family: Rhinolophidae
  - Subfamily: Rhinolophinae
    - Genus: Rhinolophus
      - Lesser horseshoe bat, R. hipposideros LC
  - Subfamily: Hipposiderinae
    - Genus: Asellia
      - Trident leaf-nosed bat, Asellia tridens LC
    - Genus: Hipposideros
      - Sundevall's roundleaf bat, Hipposideros caffer LC
      - Ethiopian large-eared roundleaf bat, Hipposideros megalotis NT
    - Genus: Triaenops
      - Persian trident bat, Triaenops persicus LC

== Order: Cetacea (whales) ==
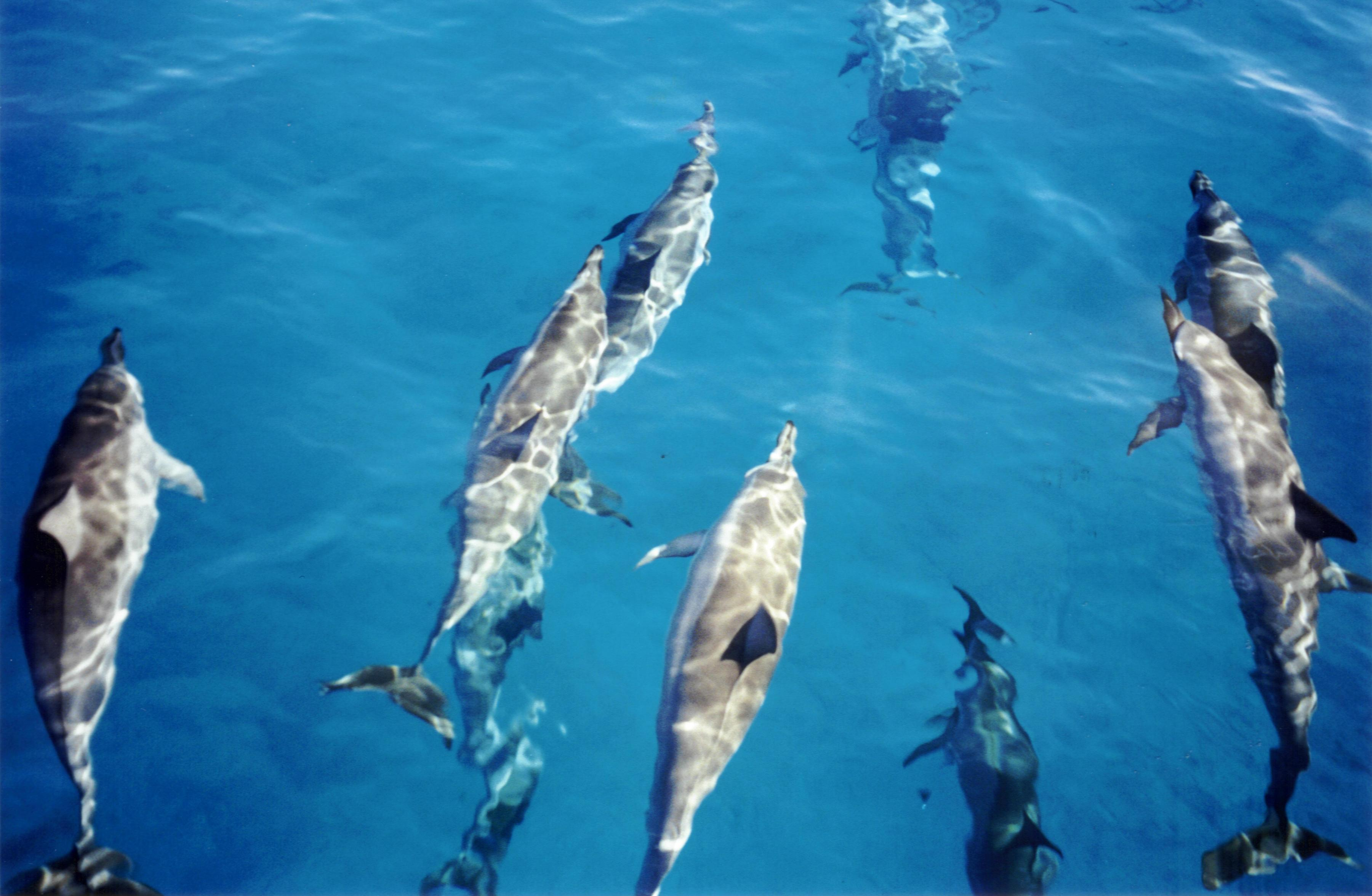
Spinner dolphins

The order Cetacea includes whales, dolphins and porpoises. They are the mammals most fully adapted to aquatic life with a spindle-shaped nearly hairless body, protected by a thick layer of blubber, and forelimbs and tail modified to provide propulsion underwater.

- Suborder: Mysticeti
  - Family: Balaenopteridae (baleen whales)
    - Genus: Balaenoptera
      - Common minke whale, Balaenoptera acutorostrata
      - Fin whale, Balaenoptera physalus
      - Blue whale, Balaenoptera musculus
    - Genus: Megaptera
      - Humpback whale, Megaptera novaeangliae
- Suborder: Odontoceti
  - Superfamily: Platanistoidea
    - Family: Delphinidae (marine dolphins)
      - Genus: Delphinus
        - Long-beaked common dolphin, Delphinus capensis DD
      - Genus: Feresa
        - Pygmy killer whale, Feresa attenuata DD
      - Genus: Globicephala
        - Short-finned pilot whale, Globicephala macrorhyncus DD
      - Genus: Lagenodelphis
        - Fraser's dolphin, Lagenodelphis hosei DD
      - Genus: Grampus
        - Risso's dolphin, Grampus griseus DD
      - Genus: Orcinus
        - Killer whale, Orcinus orca DD
      - Genus: Peponocephala
        - Melon-headed whale, Peponocephala electra DD
      - Genus: Sousa
        - Indian humpback dolphin, Sousa plumbea DD
      - Genus: Stenella
        - Pantropical spotted dolphin, Stenella attenuata DD
        - Striped dolphin, Stenella coeruleoalba DD
        - Spinner dolphin, Stenella longirostris DD
      - Genus: Steno
        - Rough-toothed dolphin, Steno bredanensis DD
      - Genus: Tursiops
        - Common bottlenose dolphin, Tursiops truncatus
        - Indo-Pacific bottlenose dolphin, Tursiops aduncus
    - Family: Physeteridae (sperm whales)
      - Genus: Physeter
        - Sperm whale, Physeter catodon DD
    - Family: Kogiidae (dwarf sperm whales)
      - Genus: Kogia
        - Pygmy sperm whale, Kogia breviceps DD
        - Dwarf sperm whale, Kogia sima DD
  - Superfamily Ziphioidea
    - Family: Ziphidae (beaked whales)
      - Genus: Indopacetus
        - Tropical bottlenose whale, Indopacetus pacificus DD
      - Genus: Mesoplodon
        - Ginkgo-toothed beaked whale, Mesoplodon ginkgodens DD
        - Blainville's beaked whale, Mesoplodon densirostris DD
      - Genus: Ziphius
        - Cuvier's beaked whale, Ziphius cavirostris DD

== Order: Carnivora (carnivorans) ==
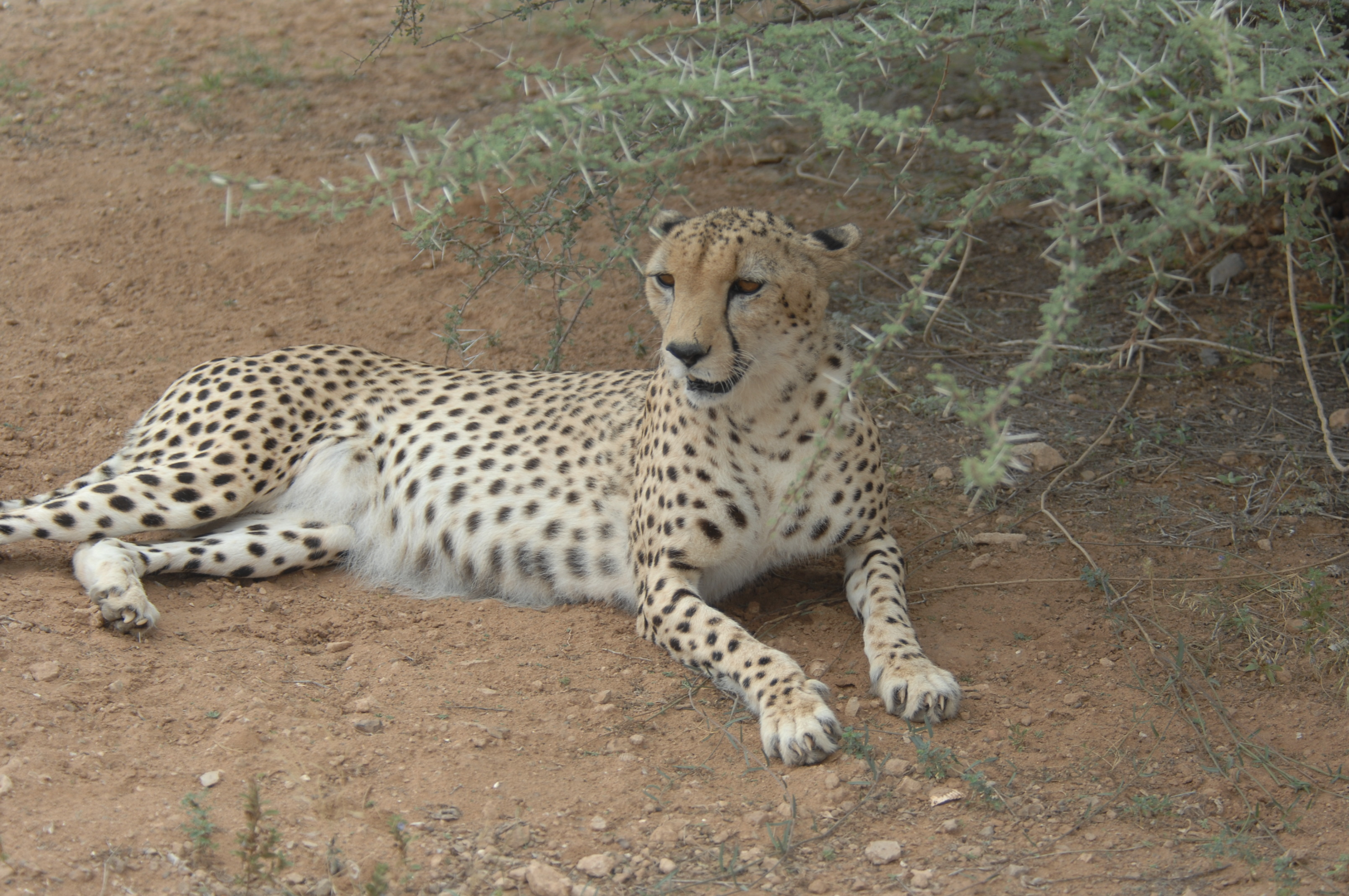
Cheetah

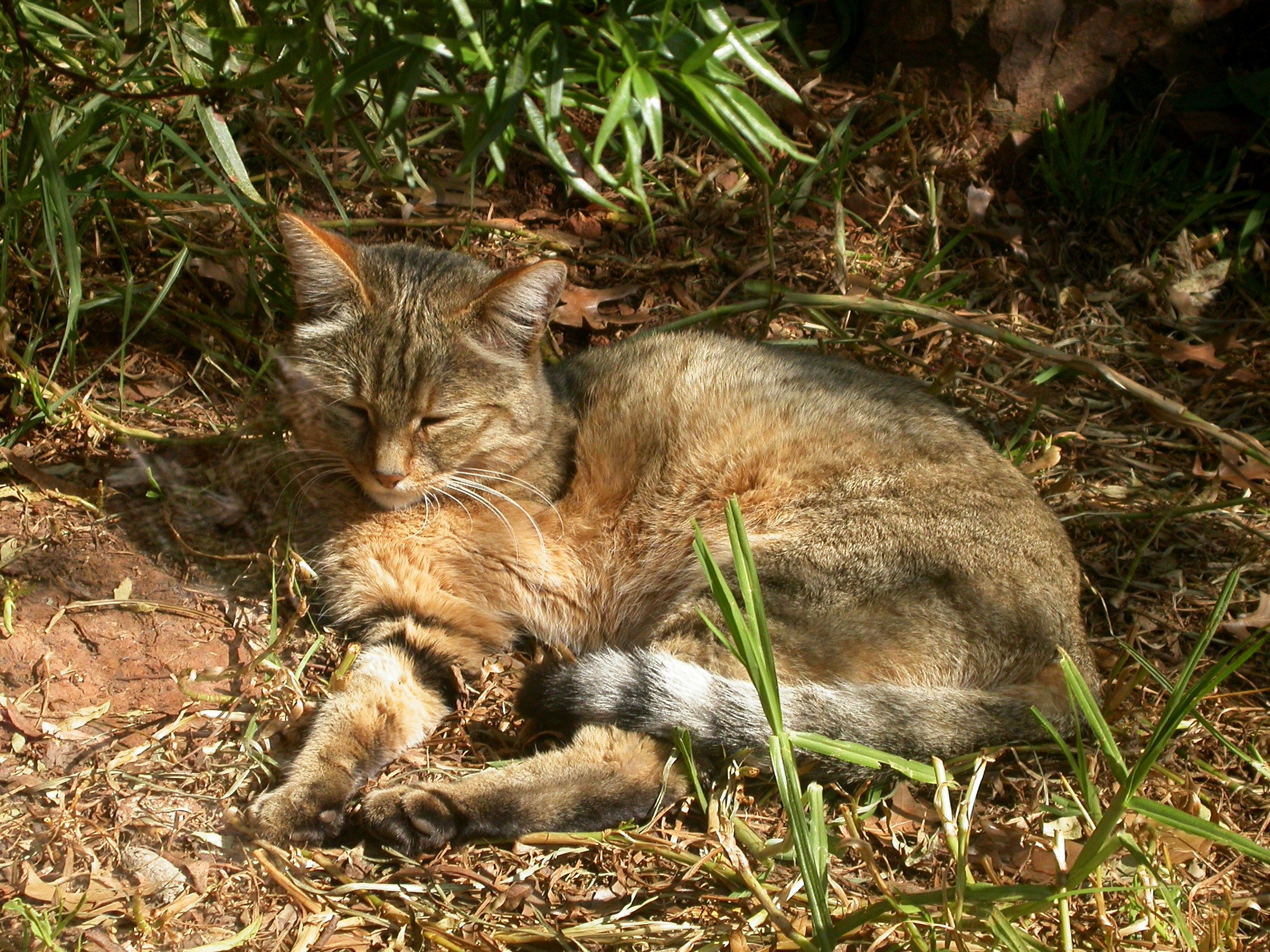
African wildcat

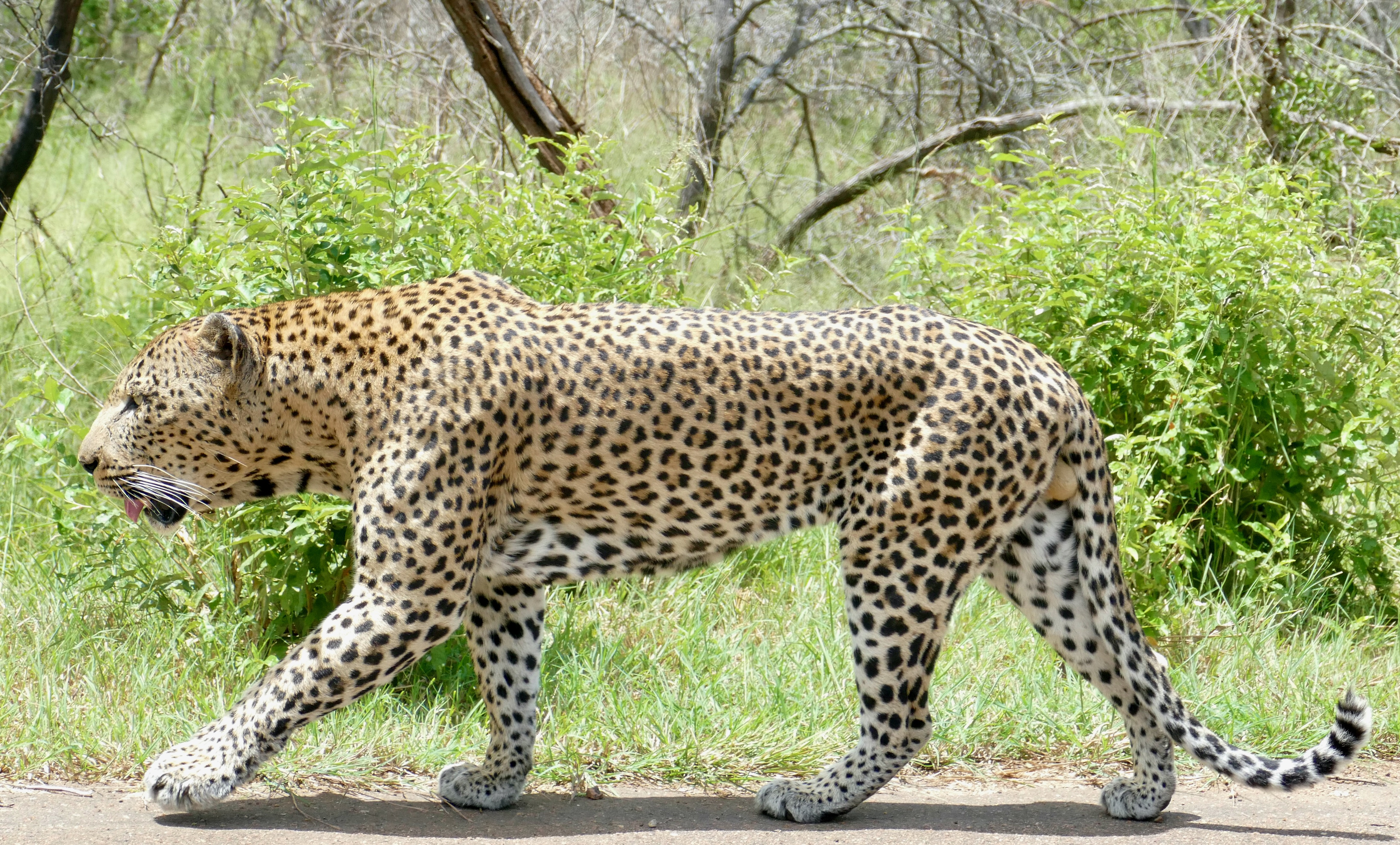
African leopard

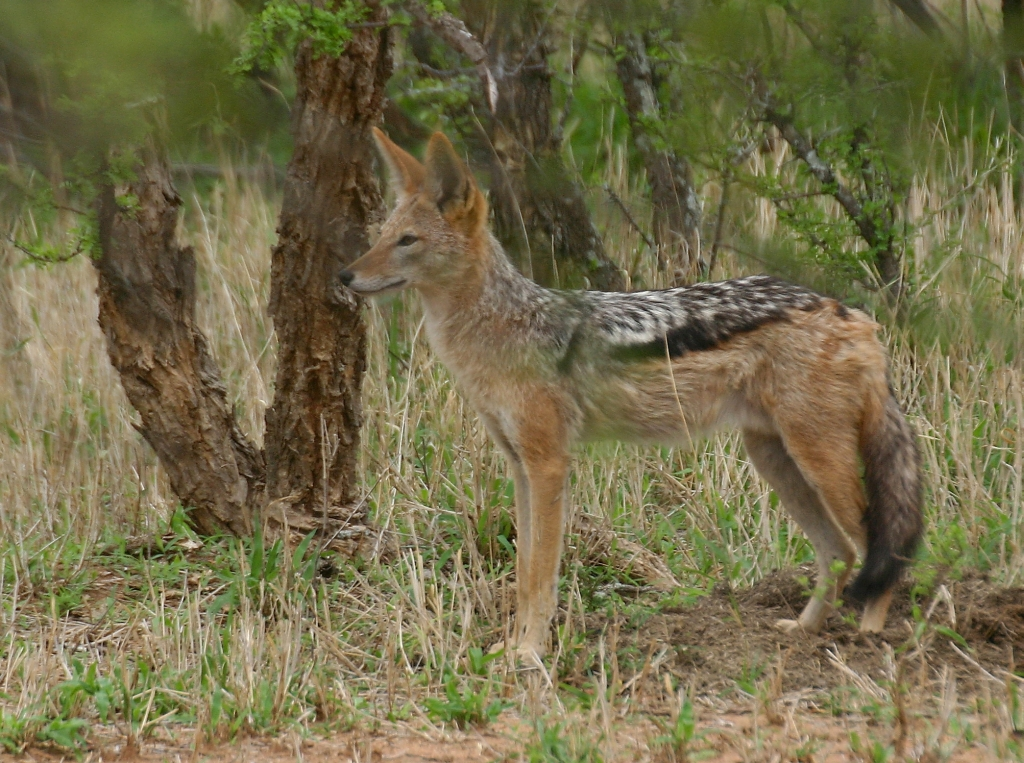
Black-backed jackal

There are over 260 species of carnivorans, the majority of which feed primarily on meat. They have a characteristic skull shape and dentition.

- Suborder: Feliformia
  - Family: Felidae (cats)
    - Subfamily: Felinae
      - Genus: Acinonyx
        - Cheetah A. jubatus, presence uncertain
      - Genus: Caracal
        - Caracal, C. caracal LC
      - Genus: Leptailurus
        - Serval, L. serval LC
    - Subfamily: Pantherinae
      - Genus: Panthera
        - Leopard, P. pardus VU
          - African leopard, P. p. pardus
  - Family: Viverridae (civets, mongooses, etc.)
    - Subfamily: Viverrinae
      - Genus: Genetta
        - Abyssinian genet, G. abyssinica DD
  - Family: Hyaenidae (hyaenas)
    - Genus: Crocuta
      - Spotted hyena, C. crocuta LC
    - Genus: Hyaena
      - Striped hyena, H. hyaena LC
- Suborder: Caniformia
  - Family: Canidae (dogs, foxes)
    - Genus: Canis
      - African golden wolf, C. lupaster LC
    - Genus: Lupulella
      - Black-backed jackal, L. mesomelas LC
  - Family: Mustelidae (mustelids)
    - Genus: Ictonyx
      - Striped polecat, I. striatus LC
    - Genus: Mellivora
      - Honey badger, M. capensis LC

== Order: Perissodactyla (odd-toed ungulates) ==
The odd-toed ungulates are browsing and grazing mammals. They are usually large to very large, and have relatively simple stomachs and a large middle toe.

- Family: Equidae (horses etc.)
  - Genus: Equus
    - African wild ass, E. africanus CR presence uncertain
      - Somali wild ass, E. a. somaliensis presence uncertain

== Order: Artiodactyla (even-toed ungulates) ==
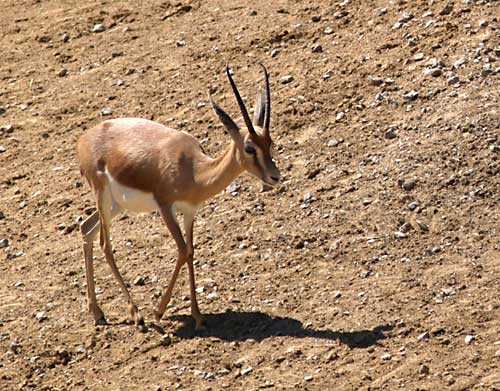
Dorcas gazelle

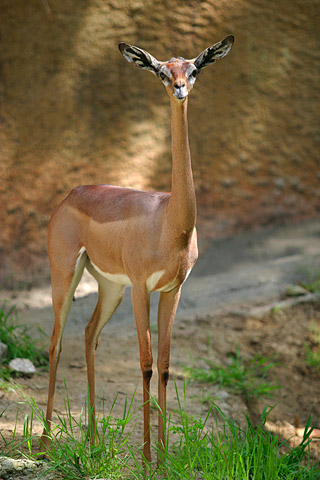
Gerenuk

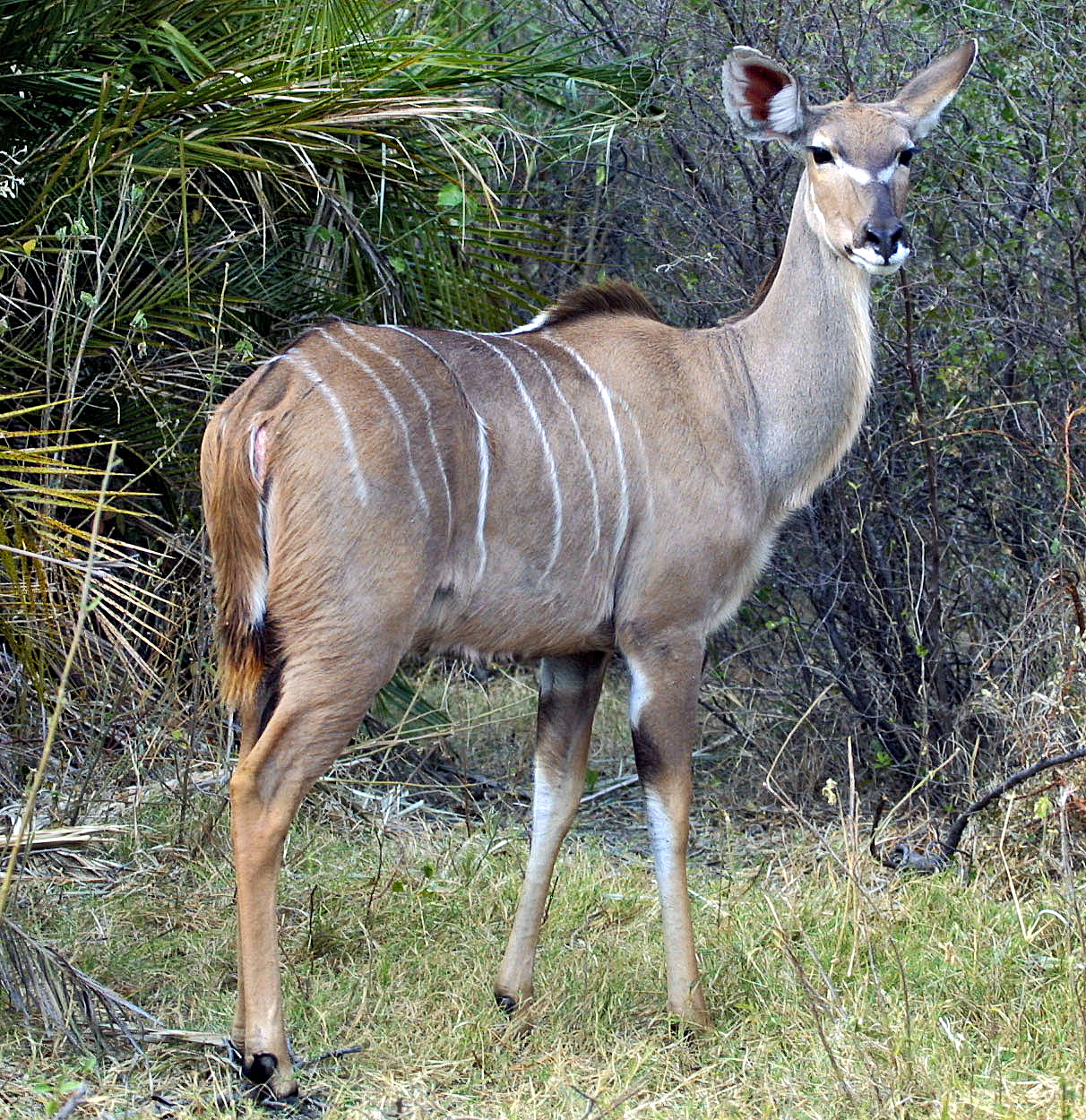
Greater kudu

The even-toed ungulates are ungulates whose weight is borne about equally by the third and fourth toes, rather than mostly or entirely by the third as in perissodactyls. There are about 220 artiodactyl species, including many that are of great economic importance to humans.

- Family: Suidae (pigs)
  - Subfamily: Phacochoerinae
    - Genus: Phacochoerus
      - Desert warthog, Phacochoerus aethiopicus LR/lc
      - Common warthog, Phacochoerus africanus LR/lc
- Family: Bovidae (cattle, antelope, sheep, goats)
  - Subfamily: Antilopinae
    - Genus: Dorcatragus
      - Beira, Dorcatragus megalotis VU
    - Genus: Gazella
      - Dorcas gazelle, Gazella dorcas VU
      - Soemmerring's gazelle, Gazella soemmerringii VU
    - Genus: Litocranius
      - Gerenuk, Litocranius walleri LR/cd
    - Genus: Madoqua
      - Salt's dik-dik, Madoqua saltiana LR/lc
    - Genus: Oreotragus
      - Klipspringer, Oreotragus oreotragus LR/cd
  - Subfamily: Bovinae
    - Genus: Tragelaphus
      - Lesser kudu, Tragelaphus imberbis NT possibly extirpated
      - Greater kudu, Tragelaphus strepsiceros LC possibly extirpated
  - Subfamily: Cephalophinae
    - Genus: Sylvicapra
      - Common duiker, Sylvicapra grimmia LR/lc
  - Subfamily: Hippotraginae
    - Genus: Oryx
      - East African oryx, Oryx beisa EN possibly extirpated

== Extirpated ==
The following species are locally extinct in Djibouti:

- Lion, Panthera leo

== See also ==
- Wildlife of Djibouti
- List of chordate orders
- Lists of mammals by region
- List of prehistoric mammals
- Mammal classification
