= Fiery spiny mouse =

Conservation status
- Least Concern (IUCN 3.1)

Scientific classification
- Kingdom: Animalia
- Phylum: Chordata
- Class: Mammalia
- Order: Rodentia
- Family: Muridae
- Genus: Acomys
- Species: A. ignitus

Binomial name
- Acomys ignitus Dollman, 1910

Species of mammal

The fiery spiny mouse (Acomys ignitus) is a species of rodent in the family Muridae found in Kenya and Tanzania. Its natural habitats are dry savanna and rocky areas. It may be found as a commensal in human habitations.

== Description ==
While most spiny mice are small in size, the fiery spiny mouse (A. ignitus) is slightly larger, measuring at approximately 10 cm in length. The species gets its name from the hair on their coats that are connected in groups. These groups of hair are stiff guard hairs, resembling tiny quills and they are able to separate from the skin quite easily. Unlike other species in the genus, the fiery spiny mouse does not lose its bare, scaled tail as easily.

The fiery spiny mouse varies in color from a deep brown to a reddish mixed with some black on its back while the belly is white. The dorsal surface color has also been described as being orange in color. It has medium-sized ears and black eyes.

== Distribution and habitat ==
The fiery spiny mouse is found in Northeastern Tanzania, near the Usambara Mountains and in Southern Kenya. It has a strictly confined habitat, occupying primarily rocky habitats in dry savannas in lower altitudes between 700 meters to 1,000 meters. The species is isolated on cliffs and outcrops and as a result, there's uneven distribution among populations.

However, it's not uncommon to find the species in gardens, grain storage units and straw huts. In human settlements, the fiery spiny mouse has an advantage when competing against Wilson's spiny mouse (A. wilsoni), gaining preferred resources. With human settlements there's more dietary resources, like seeds.

== Phylogeny ==
The fiery mouse is in the order Rodentia and in the family Muridae. It is thought to be most closely related to Acomys pulchellus, Acomys kempi, Acomys montanus, and Acomys cahirinus.

== Diet ==
The fiery spiny mouse is omnivorous, even though it primarily eats grains, it also eat insects. They drink water easily and in dry bush country, they suck the water from leaves.

== Behavior ==
Generally, fiery spiny mice are gentle in nature and rarely bite. They are also described as being very shy. However, in some cases, when living in groups, an individual will kill and somewhat eat the other members of the group. This was a behavior that was observed primarily in captivity. The fiery spiny mouse is nocturnal, doing most of its activity in the night hours.
