= Autotomy =

Self-amputation

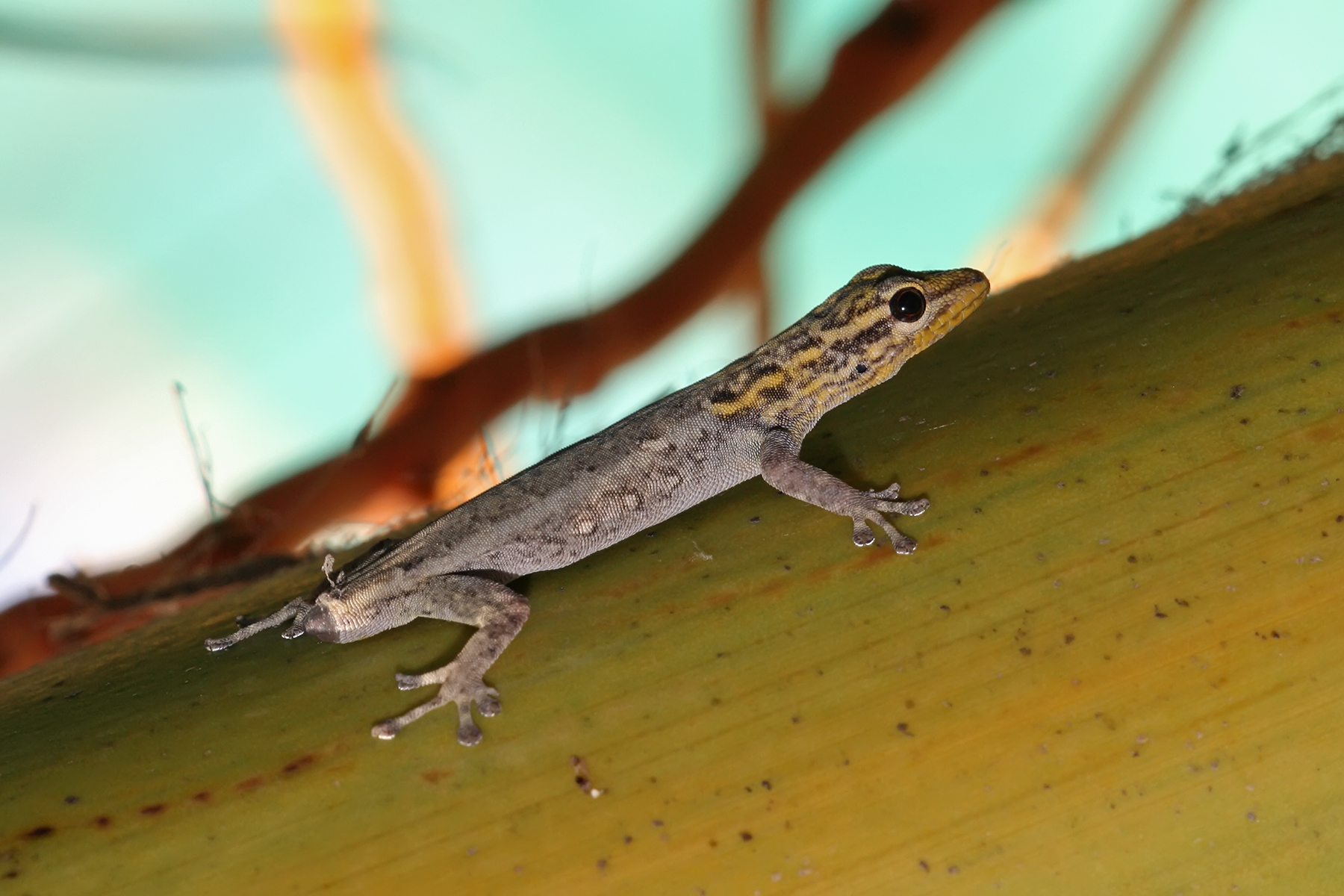
A white-headed dwarf gecko with tail lost due to autotomy

Autotomy ('self-amputation', from the Ancient Greek auto-, "self-" and tome, "severing") is the behaviour whereby an animal sheds or discards an appendage, usually as a self-preservation mechanism to elude a predator's grasp or to distract the predator and thereby allow escape. Some animals are able to regenerate the lost body part later. Autotomy is thought to have evolved independently at least nine times. The term was coined in 1883 by Léon Fredericq.

== Vertebrates ==
=== Reptiles and amphibians ===
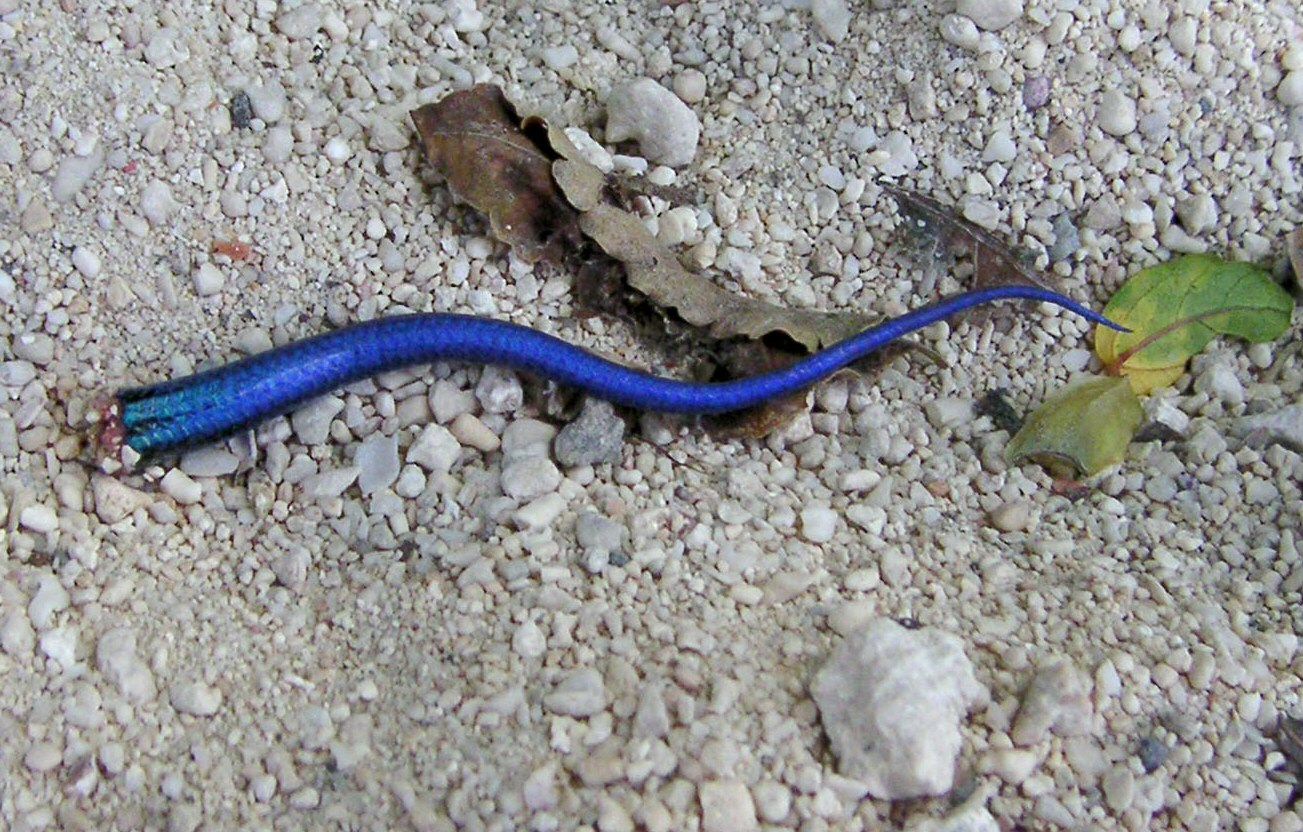
A lizard tail shed by autotomy

An autotomised skink tail exhibiting continued movement

A slow worm's shed tail continues to twitch after autotomy

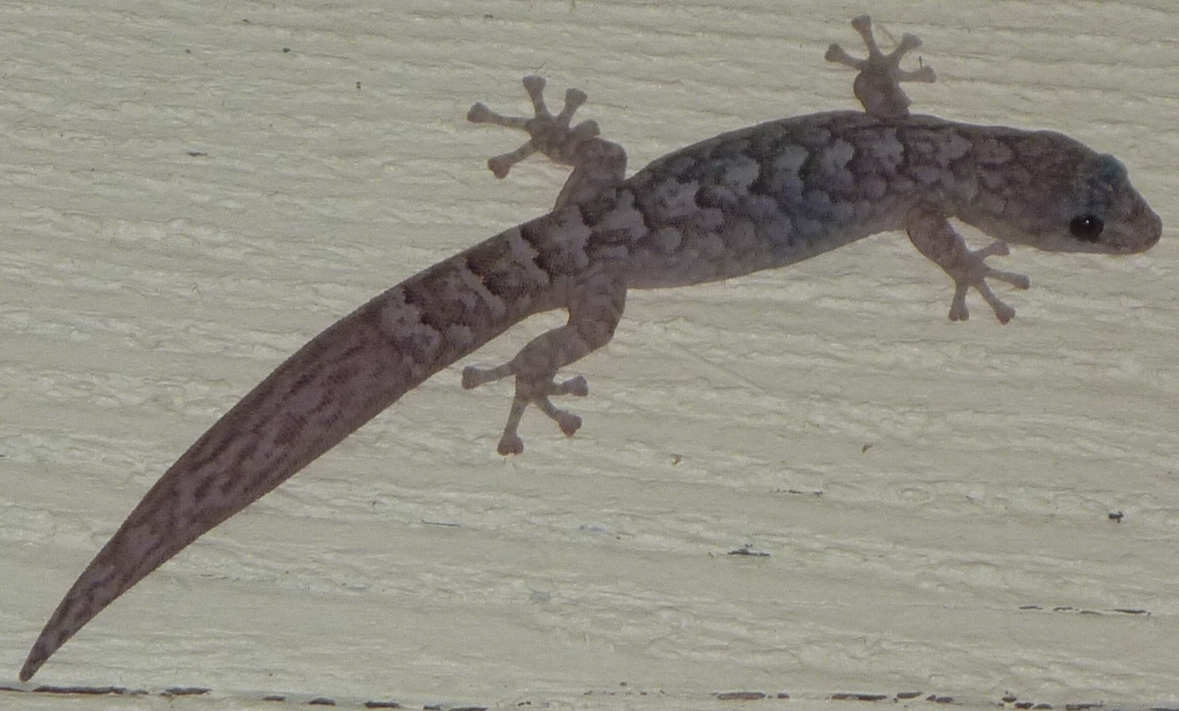
The conspicuous change in the tail pattern of this marbled gecko indicates regeneration after autotomy.

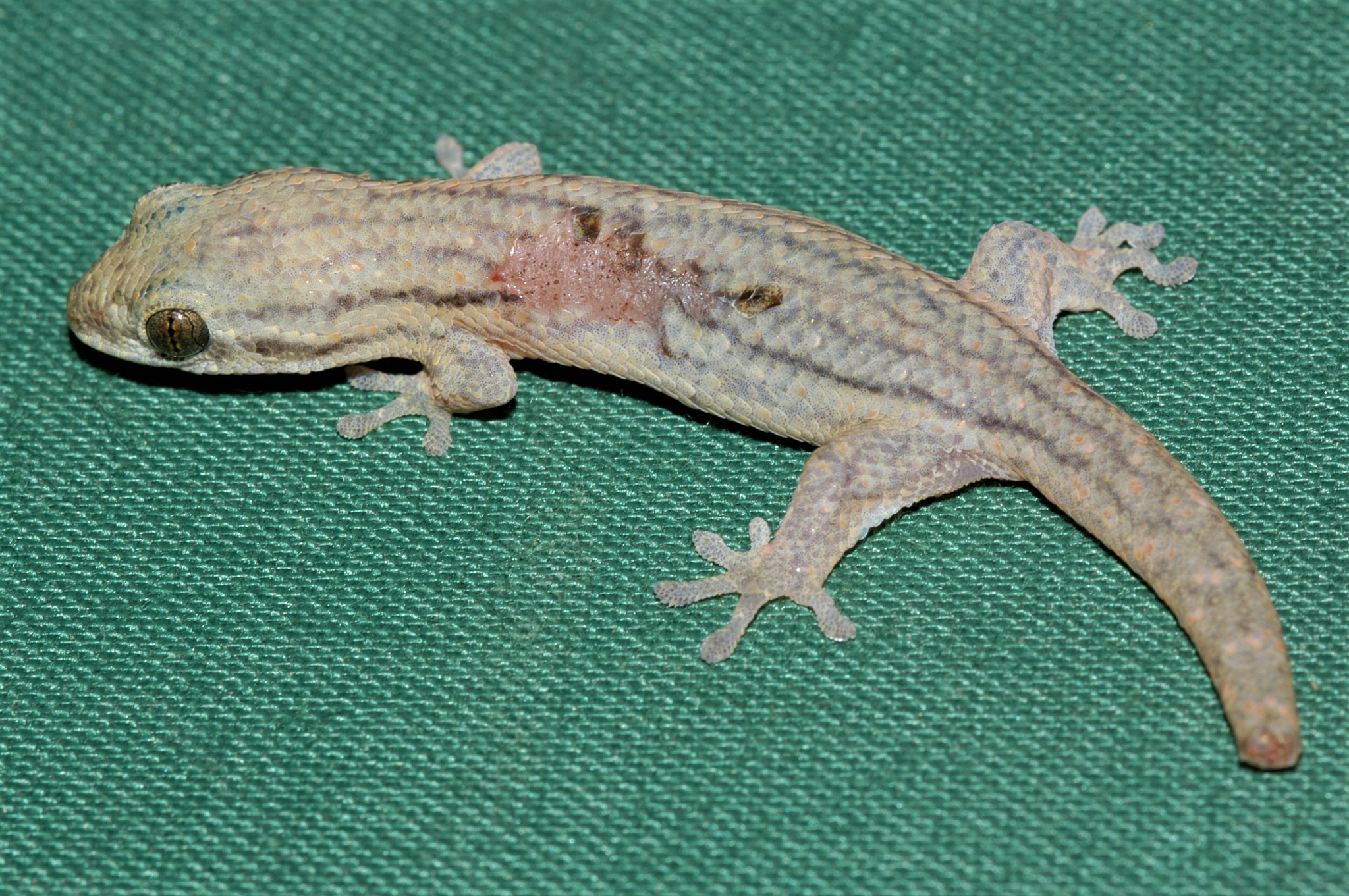
A fish scale gecko showing both autotomized scales and tail

Some lizards, salamanders, snakes, and tuatara when caught by the tail will shed part of it in attempting to escape. In many species the detached tail will continue to wriggle, creating a deceptive sense of continued struggle, and distracting the predator's attention from the fleeing prey animal. In addition, many species of lizards, such as Plestiodon fasciatus, Cordylosaurus subtessellatus, Holaspis guentheri, Phelsuma barbouri, and Ameiva wetmorei, have elaborately colored blue tails which have been shown to divert predatory attacks toward the tail and away from the body and head. Depending upon the species, the animal may be able to partially regenerate its tail, typically over a period of weeks or months. Though functional, the new tail section often is shorter and will contain cartilage rather than regenerated vertebrae of bone, and in color and texture the skin of the regenerated organ generally differs distinctly from its original appearance. However, some salamanders can regenerate a morphologically complete and identical tail. Some reptiles, such as the western fence lizard, may develop split or branched tails after autotomy.

==== Mechanism ====
The technical term for this ability to drop the tail is 'caudal autotomy'. In most lizards that sacrifice the tail in this manner, breakage occurs only when the tail is grasped with sufficient force, but some animals, such as some species of geckos, can perform true autotomy, throwing off the tail when sufficiently stressed, such as when attacked by ants.

Caudal autotomy in lizards takes two forms. In the first form, called intervertebral autotomy, the tail breaks between the vertebrae. The second form of caudal autotomy is intravertebral autotomy, in which there are zones of weakness, fracture planes across each vertebra in the mid-part of the tail. In this second type of autotomy the lizard contracts a muscle to fracture a vertebra, rather than break the tail between two vertebrae. Sphincter muscles in the tail then contract around the caudal artery to minimize bleeding. Another adaptation associated with intravertebral autotomy is that skin flaps fold over the wound at the site of autotomy to readily seal the wound, which can minimize infection at the autotomy site. Caudal autotomy is prevalent among lizards; it has been recorded in 13 of approximately 20 families.

==== Effectiveness and costs ====
Caudal autotomy is present as an anti-predator tactic but is also present in species that have high rates of intraspecific competition and aggression. The Agama agama lizard fights by using its tail as a whip against other conspecifics. It can autotomize its tail but this is met with a social cost - tail loss decreases social standing and mating ability. For example, Uta stansburiana suffers reduced social status following caudal autotomy, while Iberolacerta monticola experiences reduced mating success. Among Coleonyx brevis, smaller eggs or no eggs at all are produced after the tail is lost. However, the regenerated tail in Agama agama takes on a new club-like shape providing the male with a better fighting weapon, such that autotomy and regeneration work together to increase the lizard's ability to survive and reproduce. There are also examples in which salamanders will attack the tails of conspecifics in order to establish social dominance and decrease the fitness of competitors.

Despite this mechanism's effectiveness, it is costly, and is employed only after other defenses have failed. One cost is to the immune system: tail loss results in a weakened immune system which allows for mites and other harmful organisms to have a larger negative impact on individuals and reduce their health and lifespan. Since the tail plays a significant role in locomotion and energy storage of fat deposits, it is too valuable to be dropped haphazardly. Many species have evolved specific behaviors after autotomy, such as decreased activity, to compensate for negative consequences such as depleted energy resources. Some such lizards, in which the tail is a major storage organ for accumulating reserves, will return to a dropped tail after the threat has passed, and will eat it to recover part of the sacrificed supplies. Conversely, some species have been observed to attack rivals and grab their tails, which they eat after their opponents flee.

There are also adaptations that help mitigate the cost of autotomy, as seen in the highly toxic salamander Bolitoglossa rostrata, in which the individual will delay autotomy until the predator moves its jaws up the tail or holds on for a long time, allowing the salamander to retain its tail when toxicity alone can ward off predators. Regeneration is one of the highest priorities after autotomy, in order to optimize locomotor performance and recoup reproductive fitness. While regenerating their tails, caudal autotomy is restored at an energetic cost that often hinders body growth or intraspecies interactions.

==== Autotomy in the fossil record ====
Fossils of reptiles possessing the ability to autotomize that are not within the lizard family have been found that date back to the Late Carboniferous and Early Permian, belonging to the groups Recumbirostra and Captorhinidae. Two squamate species from the Jurassic period, Eichstaettisaurus schroederi and Ardeosaurus digitatellus, were identified as having intervertebral autotomy planes, and these species were placed in the squamate taxonomy as being an ancestor of current existing geckos.

=== Mammals ===
At least two species of African spiny mice, Acomys kempi and Acomys percivali, are capable of autotomic release of skin, e.g. upon being captured by a predator. They are the first mammals known to do so. They can completely regenerate the autotomically released or otherwise damaged skin tissue — regrowing hair follicles, skin, sweat glands, fur and cartilage with little or no scarring. These and other species of rodent are also known to exhibit a so-called "false caudal autotomy," whereby the skin on the tail slides off with minimal force, leaving only the bare vertebral structure. Examples of species possessing this ability are cotton rats (Sigmodon hispidus), eastern chipmunks (Tamias striatus), and degu (Octodon degus).

=== Fish ===
The giant oarfish shows evidence of self-amputation of the body posterior to the vent. This amputation can either be just involving the caudal fin and a small number of vertebrae, or it may be the entire posterior part of the body. As the organs are concentrated in the front portion of the body, these amputations do not damage any vital organs. These amputations are noted to occur several times throughout the lifetime of the fish (serial autotomy), and all fish over 1.5 m (4.9 ft) long have bodies shortened by this. It is unclear why these amputations occur, as oarfish have no documented natural predators, so it is unlikely to be a predation response. Despite a common misconception that oarfish are preyed on by sharks, no shark attacks on oarfish have been documented. There is one recorded instance of a pod of pilot whales attacking an oarfish, but they did not eat it.

== Invertebrates ==
Over 200 species of invertebrates are capable of using autotomy as an avoidance or protective behaviour. These animals can voluntarily shed appendages when necessary for survival. Autotomy can occur in response to chemical, thermal and electrical stimulation, but is perhaps most frequently a response to mechanical stimulation during capture by a predator. Autotomy serves either to improve the chances of escape or to reduce further damage occurring to the remainder of the animal such as the spread of a chemical toxin after being stung.

=== Molluscs ===
Autotomy occurs in some species of octopus for survival and for reproduction: the specialized reproductive arm (the hectocotylus) detaches from the male during mating and remains within the female's mantle cavity.

Species of (land) slugs in the genus Prophysaon can self-amputate a portion of their tail. There is known autotomy of the tail of sea snail Oxynoe panamensis under persistent mechanical irritation.

Some sea slugs exhibit autotomy. Both Discodoris lilacina and Tomoberthella martensi will often drop their entire mantle skirt when handled, leading to Discodoris lilacina also being called Discodoris fragilis. The members of Phyllodesmium will drop a large number of their cerata each, on the tip having a large sticky gland that secretes a sticky substance. Young specimens of two Elysia species, E. atroviridis and E. marginata, can regenerate their whole parasitised body from their head which may have evolved as a defence-mechanism against internal parasites. These sea slugs are known to be able to conduct photosynthesis via incorporating chloroplasts from algal food into their cells which they use to survive after separation from their digestive system.

=== Crustaceans ===
Autotomic stone crabs are used as a self-replenishing source of food by humans, particularly in Florida. Harvesting is accomplished by removing one or both claws from the live animal and returning it to the ocean where it can regrow the lost limb(s). However, under experimental conditions, but using commercially accepted techniques, 47% of stone crabs that had both claws removed died after declawing, and 28% of single claw amputees died; 76% of the casualties died within 24 hours of declawing. The occurrence of regenerated claws in the fishery harvest is low; one study indicates less than 10%, and a more recent study indicates only 13% have regenerated claws. (See Declawing of crabs)

Post-harvest leg autotomy can be problematic in some crab and lobster fisheries, and often occurs if these crustaceans are exposed to freshwater or hypersaline water in the form of dried salt on sorting trays. The autotomy reflex in crustaceans has been proposed as an example of natural behaviour that raises questions concerning assertions on whether crustaceans can "feel pain", which may be based on definitions of "pain" that are flawed for lack of any falsifiable test, either to establish or deny the meaningfulness of the concept in this context.

=== Spiders ===
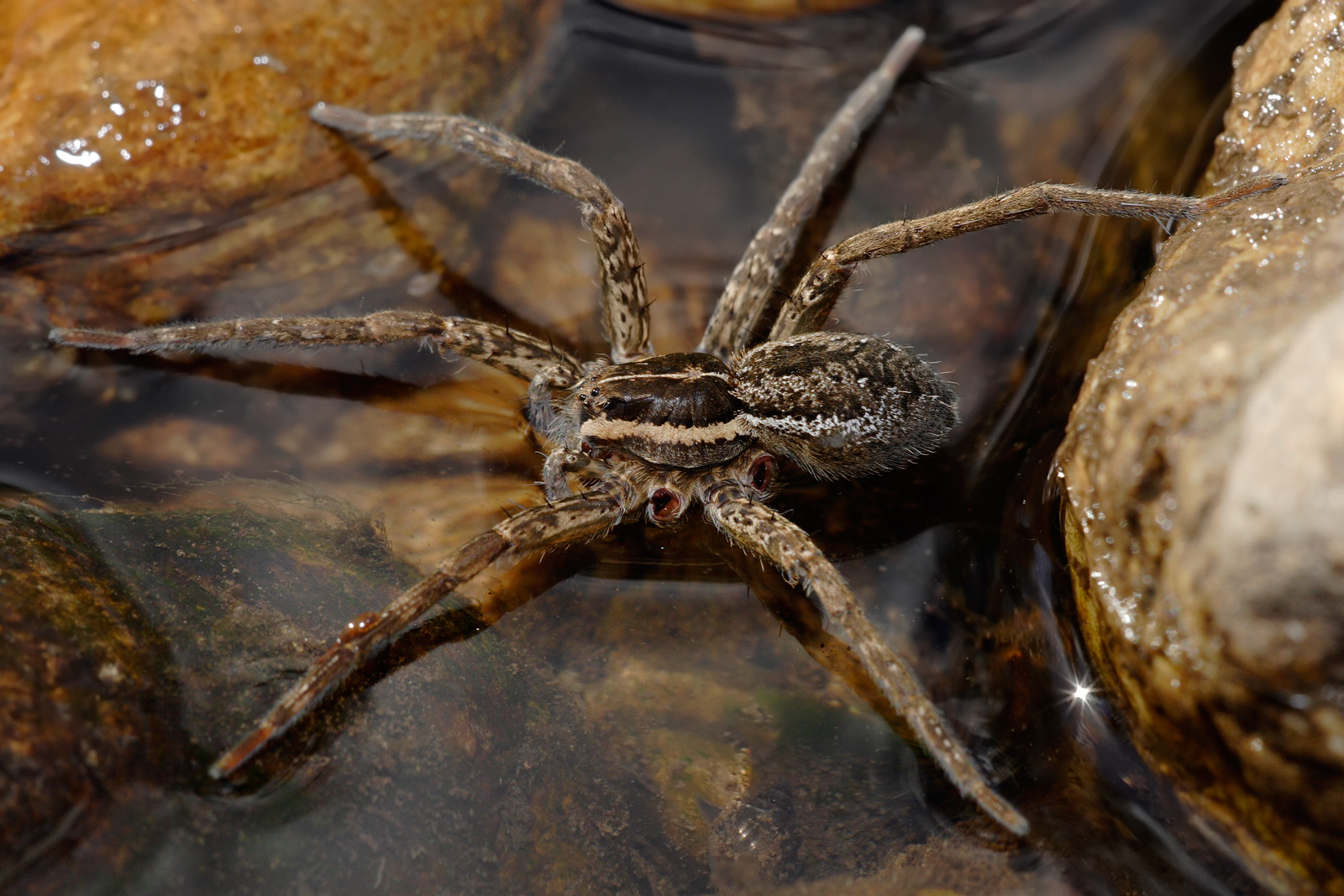
A fishing spider with two limbs missing

Under natural conditions, orb-weaving spiders (Argiope spp.) undergo autotomy if they are stung in a leg by wasps or bees. Under experimental conditions, when spiders are injected in the leg with bee or wasp venom, they shed this appendage. But, if they are injected with only saline, they rarely autotomize the leg, indicating it is not the physical injection or the ingress of fluid that necessarily causes autotomy. In addition, spiders injected with venom components which cause injected humans to report pain (serotonin, histamine, phospholipase A2 and melittin) autotomize the leg, but if the injections contain venom components which do not cause pain to humans, autotomy does not occur.

In spiders, autotomy can also play a role in mating. The male of Nephilengys malabarensis from Southeast Asia breaks off his pedipalp when transferring sperm and plugs the female's genital opening, after which the palp keeps pumping. This helps the male to avoid sexual cannibalism and if escape succeeds, the male goes on to guard the female from competitors.

=== Bees and wasps ===
Sometimes when honey bees (genus Apis) sting a victim, the barbed stinger remains embedded. As the bee tears itself loose, the stinger takes with it the entire distal segment of the bee's abdomen, along with a nerve ganglion, various muscles, a venom sac, and the end of the bee's digestive tract. This massive abdominal rupture kills the bee. Although it is widely believed that a worker honey bee can sting only once, this is a partial misconception: although the stinger is barbed so that it lodges in the victim's skin, tearing loose from the bee's abdomen and leading to its death, this only happens if the skin of the victim is sufficiently thick, such as a mammal's. The sting of a queen honey bee has no barbs, however, and does not autotomize. All species of true honey bees have this form of stinger autotomy. Two wasp species that use sting autotomy as a defense mechanism are Polybia rejecta and Synoeca surinama.

The endophallus and cornua portions of the genitalia of male honey bees (drones) also autotomize during copulation, and form a mating plug, which must be removed by the genitalia of subsequent drones if they are also to mate with the same queen. The drones die within minutes of mating.

=== Echinoderms ===
Evisceration, the ejection of the internal organs of sea cucumbers when stressed, is also a form of autotomy, and they regenerate the organ(s) lost.

Some starfish shed their arms. The arm itself may even be able to regrow into a new starfish.

== See also ==
- Ainhum
- Anti-predator adaptation
- Autoamputation
- Evisceration (autotomy)
- Self-amputation
