= List of mammals of Western Sahara =

This is a list of the mammal species recorded in Western Sahara. Of the mammal species in Western Sahara, three are critically endangered, one is endangered, five are vulnerable, and one is near threatened. One of the species listed for Western Sahara can no longer be found in the wild.

The following tags are used to highlight each species' conservation status as assessed by the International Union for Conservation of Nature:

EX	Extinct	No reasonable doubt that the last individual has died.
EW	Extinct in the wild	Known only to survive in captivity or as a naturalized populations well outside its previous range.
CR	Critically endangered	The species is in imminent risk of extinction in the wild.
EN	Endangered	The species is facing an extremely high risk of extinction in the wild.
VU	Vulnerable	The species is facing a high risk of extinction in the wild.
NT	Near threatened	The species does not meet any of the criteria that would categorise it as risking extinction but it is likely to do so in the future.
LC	Least concern	There are no current identifiable risks to the species.
DD	Data deficient	There is inadequate information to make an assessment of the risks to this species.

== Order: Rodentia (rodents) ==
Rodents make up the largest order of mammals, with over 40% of mammalian species. They have two incisors in the upper and lower jaw which grow continually and must be kept short by gnawing. Most rodents are small though the capybara can weigh up to 45 kg (99 lb).

- Suborder: Sciurognathi
  - Family: Sciuridae (squirrels)
    - Subfamily: Xerinae
      - Tribe: Xerini
        - Genus: Atlantoxerus
          - Barbary ground squirrel, Atlantoxerus getulus LC
  - Family: Muridae (mice, rats, voles, gerbils, hamsters, etc.)
    - Subfamily: Deomyinae
      - Genus: Acomys
        - Western Saharan spiny mouse, Acomys airensis LC
        - Chudeau's spiny mouse, Acomys chudeaui LC
    - Subfamily: Gerbillinae
      - Genus: Dipodillus
        - North African gerbil, Dipodillus campestris LC
      - Genus: Gerbillus
        - Lesser Egyptian gerbil, Gerbillus gerbillus LC
        - Pygmy gerbil, Gerbillus henleyi LC
      - Genus: Meriones
        - Libyan jird, Meriones libycus LC
      - Genus: Pachyuromys
        - Fat-tailed gerbil, Pachyuromys duprasi LC

== Order: Lagomorpha (lagomorphs) ==
The lagomorphs comprise two families, Leporidae (hares and rabbits), and Ochotonidae (pikas). Though they can resemble rodents, and were classified as a superfamily in that order until the early 20th century, they have since been considered a separate order. They differ from rodents in a number of physical characteristics, such as having four incisors in the upper jaw rather than two.

- Family: Leporidae (rabbits, hares)
  - Genus: Lepus
    - Cape hare, L. capensis LC
    - African savanna hare, Lepus microtis LR/lc

== Order: Erinaceomorpha (hedgehogs and gymnures) ==
The order Erinaceomorpha contains a single family, Erinaceidae, which comprise the hedgehogs and gymnures. The hedgehogs are easily recognised by their spines while gymnures look more like large rats.

- Family: Erinaceidae (hedgehogs)
  - Subfamily: Erinaceinae
    - Genus: Hemiechinus
      - Desert hedgehog, H. aethiopicus LC

== Order: Soricomorpha (shrews, moles, and solenodons) ==
The "shrew-forms" are insectivorous mammals. The shrews and solenodons closely resemble mice while the moles are stout-bodied burrowers.

- Family: Soricidae (shrews)
  - Subfamily: Crocidurinae
    - Genus: Crocidura
      - Mauritanian shrew, C. lusitania LC
      - Saharan shrew, Crocidura tarfayensis DD
      - Whitaker's shrew, Crocidura whitakeri LC

== Order: Chiroptera (bats) ==
The bats' most distinguishing feature is that their forelimbs are developed as wings, making them the only mammals capable of flight. Bat species account for about 20% of all mammals.

- Family: Rhinopomatidae
  - Genus: Rhinopoma
    - Egyptian mouse-tailed bat, R. cystops LC
    - Lesser mouse-tailed bat, Rhinopoma hardwickei LC
    - Greater mouse-tailed bat, Rhinopoma microphyllum LC

== Order: Cetacea (whales) ==
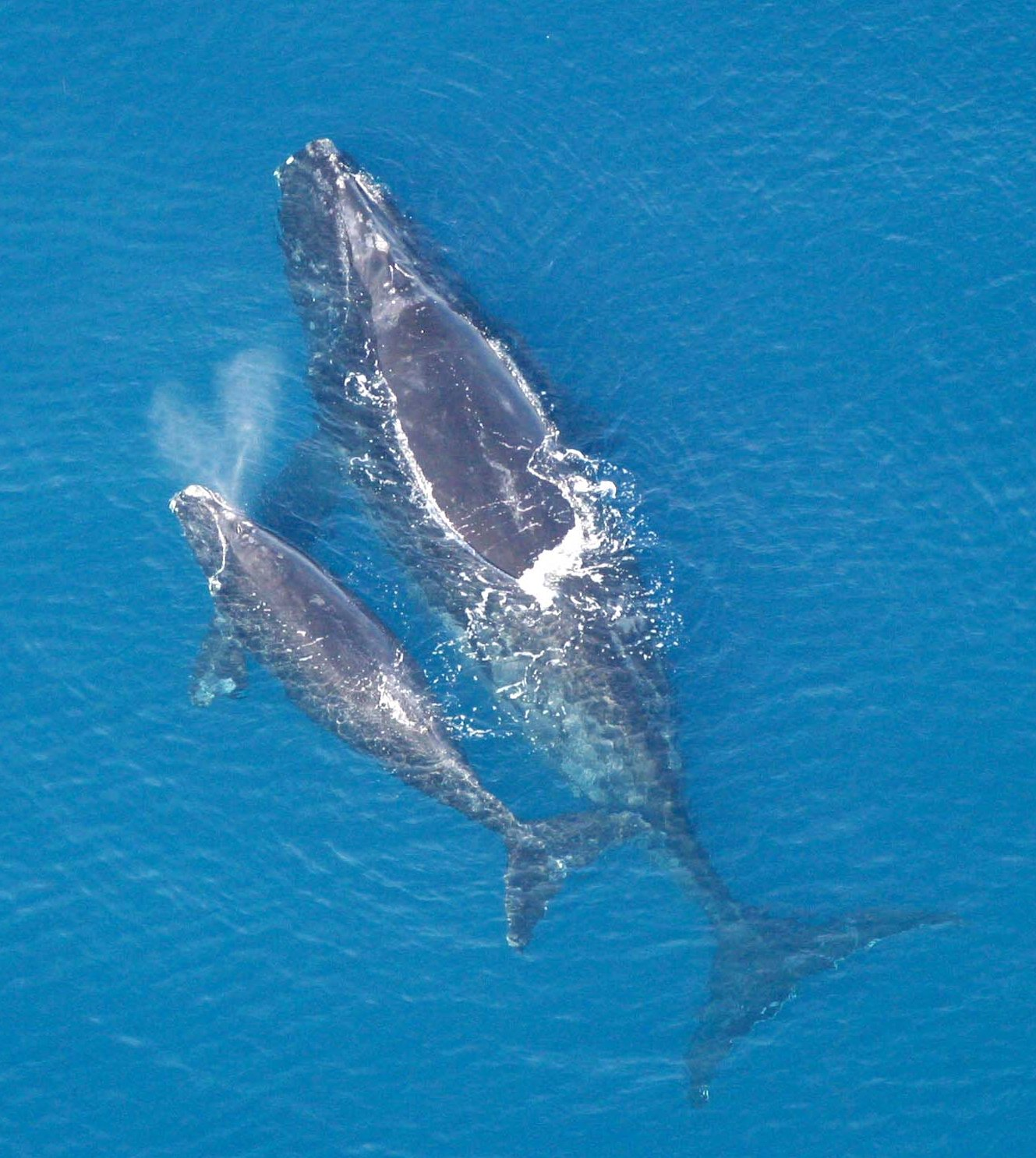
North Atlantic right whale

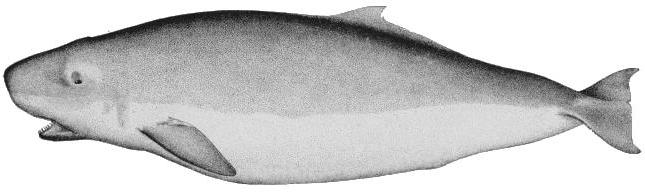
Pygmy sperm whale

Orca

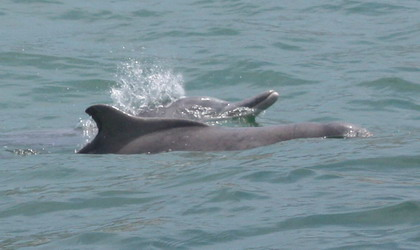
Atlantic humpback dolphin

The order Cetacea includes whales, dolphins and porpoises. They are the mammals most fully adapted to aquatic life with a spindle-shaped nearly hairless body, protected by a thick layer of blubber, and forelimbs and tail modified to provide propulsion underwater.

- Suborder: Mysticeti
  - Family: Balaenidae (right whales)
    - Genus: Eubalaena
      - North Atlantic right whale, Eubalaena glacialis CR (Seen historically)
  - Family: Balaenopteridae (rorquals)
    - Genus: Balaenoptera
      - Northern minke whale, Balaenoptera acutorostrata LC
      - Sei whale, Balaenoptera borealis EN
      - Bryde's whale, Balaenoptera edeni DD
      - Blue whale, Balaenoptera musculus EN
      - Fin whale, Balaenoptera physalus EN
    - Genus: Megaptera
      - Humpback whale, Megaptera novaengliae LC
- Suborder: Odontoceti
  - Family: Delphinidae (pilot whales and dolphins)
    - Genus: Delphinus
      - Short-beaked common dolphin, Delphinus delphis LC
    - Genus: Globicephala
      - Short-finned pilot whale, Globicephala macrorhynchus DD
      - Long-finned pilot whale, Globicephala melas DD
    - Genus: Grampus
      - Risso's dolphin, Grampus griseus LC
    - Genus: Lagenodelphis
      - Fraser's dolphin, Lagenodelphis hosei LC
    - Genus: Orcinus
      - Orca, O. orca DD
    - Genus: Pseudorca
      - False killer whale, Pseudorca crassidens DD
    - Genus: Feresa
      - Pygmy killer whale, Feresa attenuata DD
    - Genus: Stenella
      - Striped dolphin, Stenella coeruleoalba LC
      - Atlantic spotted dolphin, Stenella frontalis DD
    - Genus: Steno
      - Rough-toothed dolphin, Steno bredanensis LC
    - Genus: Tursiops
      - Common bottlenose dolphin, Tursiops truncatus LC
  - Family: Kogiidae (small sperm whales)
    - Genus: Kogia
      - Pygmy sperm whale, K. breviceps DD
      - Dwarf sperm whale, Kogia sima DD
  - Family: Phocoenidae (porpoises)
    - Genus: Phocoena
      - Harbour porpoise, Phocoena phocoena LC
  - Family: Physeteridae (sperm whales)
    - Genus: Physeter
      - Sperm whale, Physeter macrocephalus VU
  - Family: Ziphiidae (beaked whales)
    - Genus: Peponocephala
        - Melon-headed whale, Peponocephala electra DD
    - Genus: Hyperoodon
        - Northern bottlenose whale, Hyperoodon ampullatus LC
    - Genus: Mesoplodon
      - Sowerby's beaked whale, Mesoplodon bidens VU
      - Blainville's beaked whale, Mesoplodon densirostris DD
      - Gervais' beaked whale, Mesoplodon europaeus DD
      - True's beaked whale, Mesoplodon mirus DD
    - Genus: Ziphius
      - Cuvier's beaked whale, Ziphius cavirostris DD

== Order: Carnivora (carnivorans) ==
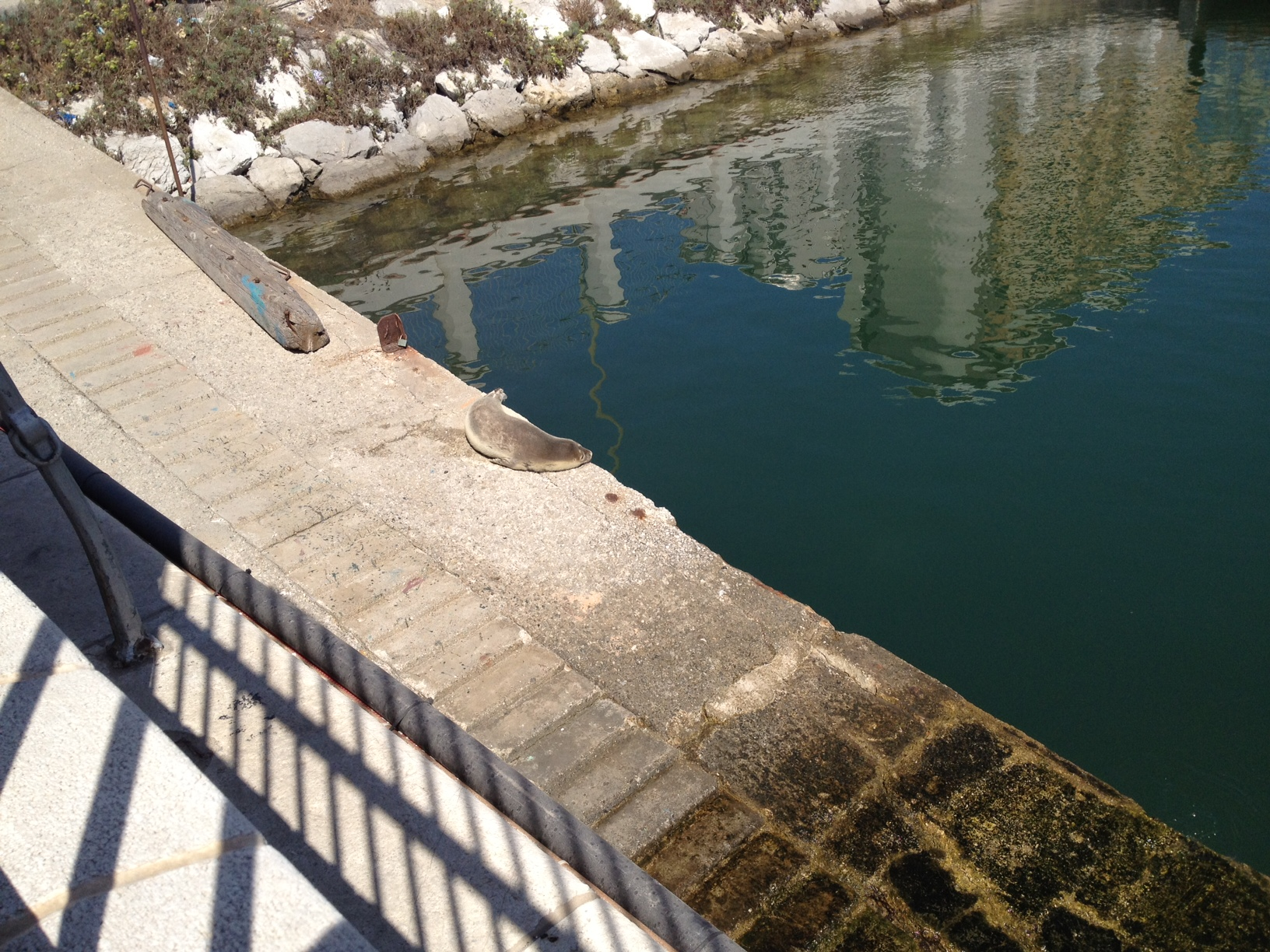
Mediterranean monk seal

There are over 260 species of carnivorans, the majority of which feed primarily on meat. They have a characteristic skull shape and dentition.

- Suborder: Feliformia
  - Family: Felidae (cats)
    - Subfamily: Felinae
      - Genus: Felis
        - African wildcat, F. lybica
        - Sand cat, F. margarita NT
    - Subfamily: Pantherinae
      - Genus: Panthera
        - Lion, P. leo VU extirpated
  - Family: Hyaenidae (hyaenas)
    - Genus: Hyaena
      - Striped hyena, H. hyaena LC
- Suborder: Caniformia
  - Family: Canidae (dogs, foxes)
    - Genus: Canis
      - African golden wolf, C. lupaster LC
    - Genus: Vulpes
      - Fennec fox, Vulpes zerda LC
      - Rüppell's fox, Vulpes rueppellii LC
  - Family: Mustelidae (mustelids)
    - Genus: Ictonyx
      - Saharan striped polecat, Ictonyx libyca LC
    - Genus: Mellivora
      - Honey badger, M. capensis LC
- Suborder: Pinnipedia
  - Family: Phocidae(earless seals)
    - Genus: Monachus
      - Mediterranean monk seal, M. monachus EN

== Order: Artiodactyla (even-toed ungulates) ==
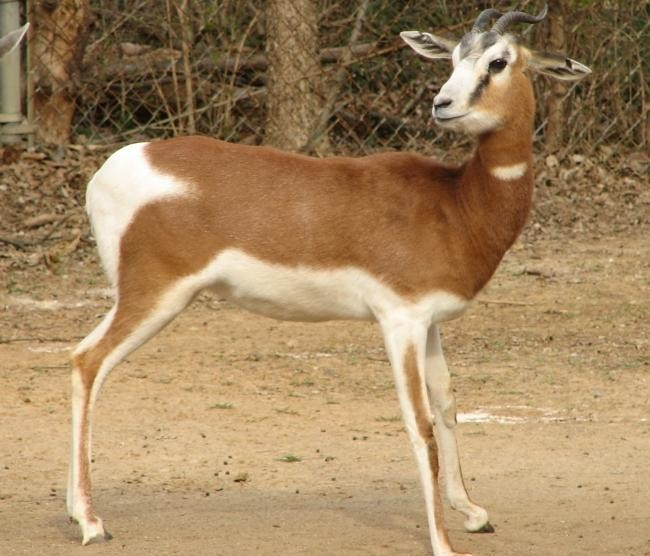
Dama gazelle

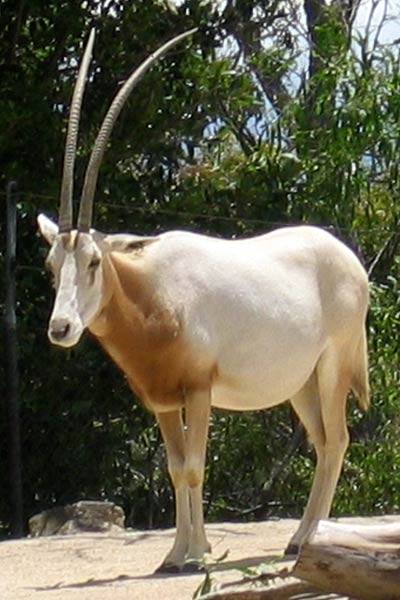
Scimitar oryx

The even-toed ungulates are ungulates whose weight is borne about equally by the third and fourth toes, rather than mostly or entirely by the third as in perissodactyls. There are about 220 artiodactyl species, including many that are of great economic importance to humans.

- Family: Bovidae (cattle, antelope, sheep, goats)
  - Subfamily: Antilopinae
    - Genus: Gazella
      - Cuvier's gazelle, G. cuvieri EN
      - Dorcas gazelle, G. dorcas VU
    - Genus: Nanger
      - Dama gazelle, N. dama CR extirpated
  - Subfamily: Caprinae
    - Genus: Ammotragus
      - Barbary sheep, A. lervia VU
  - Subfamily: Hippotraginae
    - Genus: Addax
      - Addax, A. nasomaculatus CR extirpated
    - Genus: Oryx
      - Scimitar oryx, O. dammah EN extirpated

== See also ==
- List of chordate orders
- Lists of mammals by region
- Mammal classification
- List of mammals described in the 2000s
