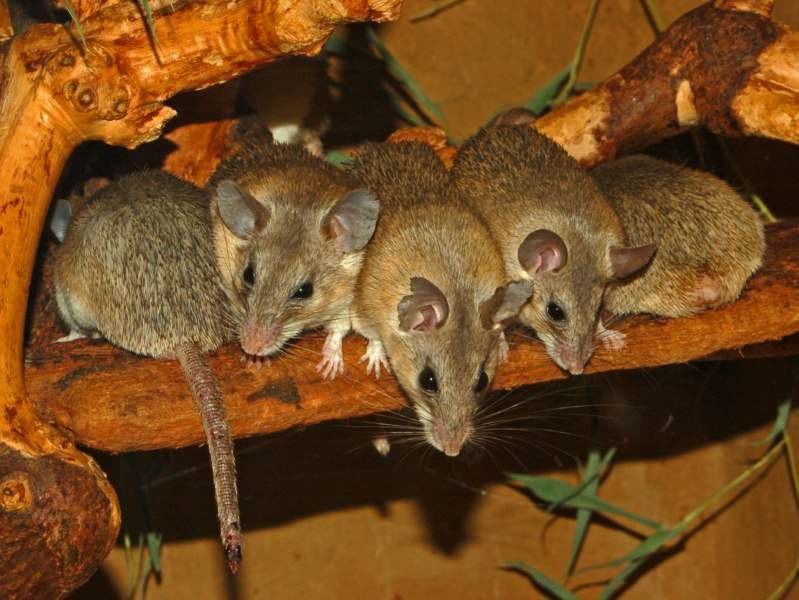
- at the Prague Zoo

Conservation status
- Data Deficient (IUCN 3.1)

Scientific classification
- Kingdom: Animalia
- Phylum: Chordata
- Class: Mammalia
- Infraclass: Placentalia
- Order: Rodentia
- Family: Muridae
- Genus: Acomys
- Species: A. cilicicus

Binomial name
- Acomys cilicicus Spitzenberger, 1978

= Asia Minor spiny mouse =

Species of rodent

The Asia Minor spiny mouse (Acomys cilicicus) is a species of rodent in the family Muridae.

== Description ==
Acomys cilicicus is a small terrestrial and social rodent, living in large groups. The head and the body reach a length of 104–121 mm (4.1–4.8 in), with a tail of about 102–117 mm (4.0–4.6 in) and a weight up to 48 g.

The upper side of the body is dark gray, with purple reflections, while the lower sides are yellowish-white and the flanks are light brown. The tail is hairless, scaly and shorter than the head and body. The chromosome number is 2n = 36.

In captivity, these mice reproduce and live for about four years. Since this species was previously considered endangered, a protection program is in place and government permission is needed for export from Turkey. Only a few zoos in the world have individuals of this species (Chester, Cotswold Wildlife Park, Riga, Prague, Tallinn and Helsinki Zoo).

This species is related to the Cairo spiny mouse (Acomys cahirinus) and the Cyprus spiny mouse (Acomys nesiotes), but significant morphological differences are seen.

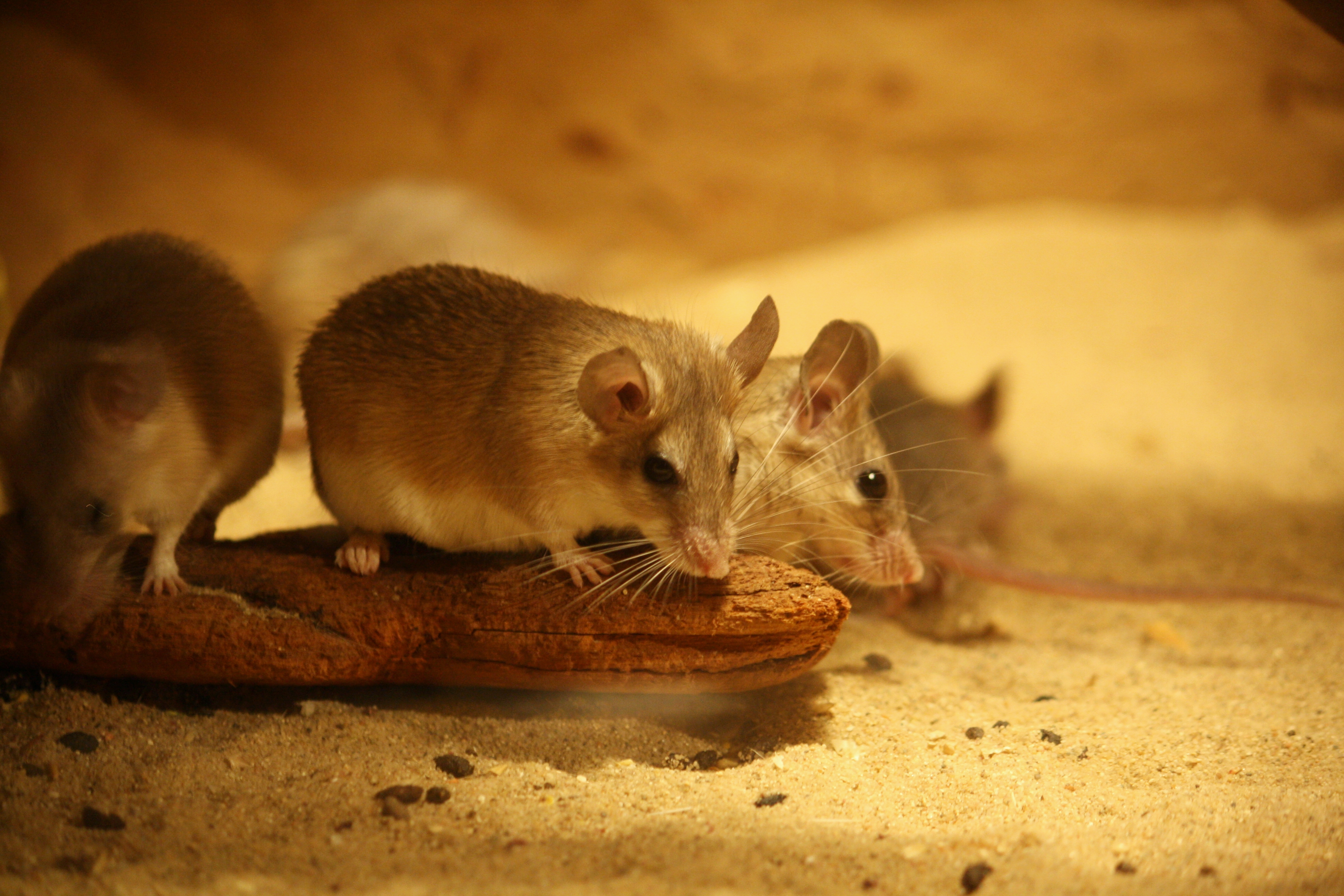
A. cilicicus

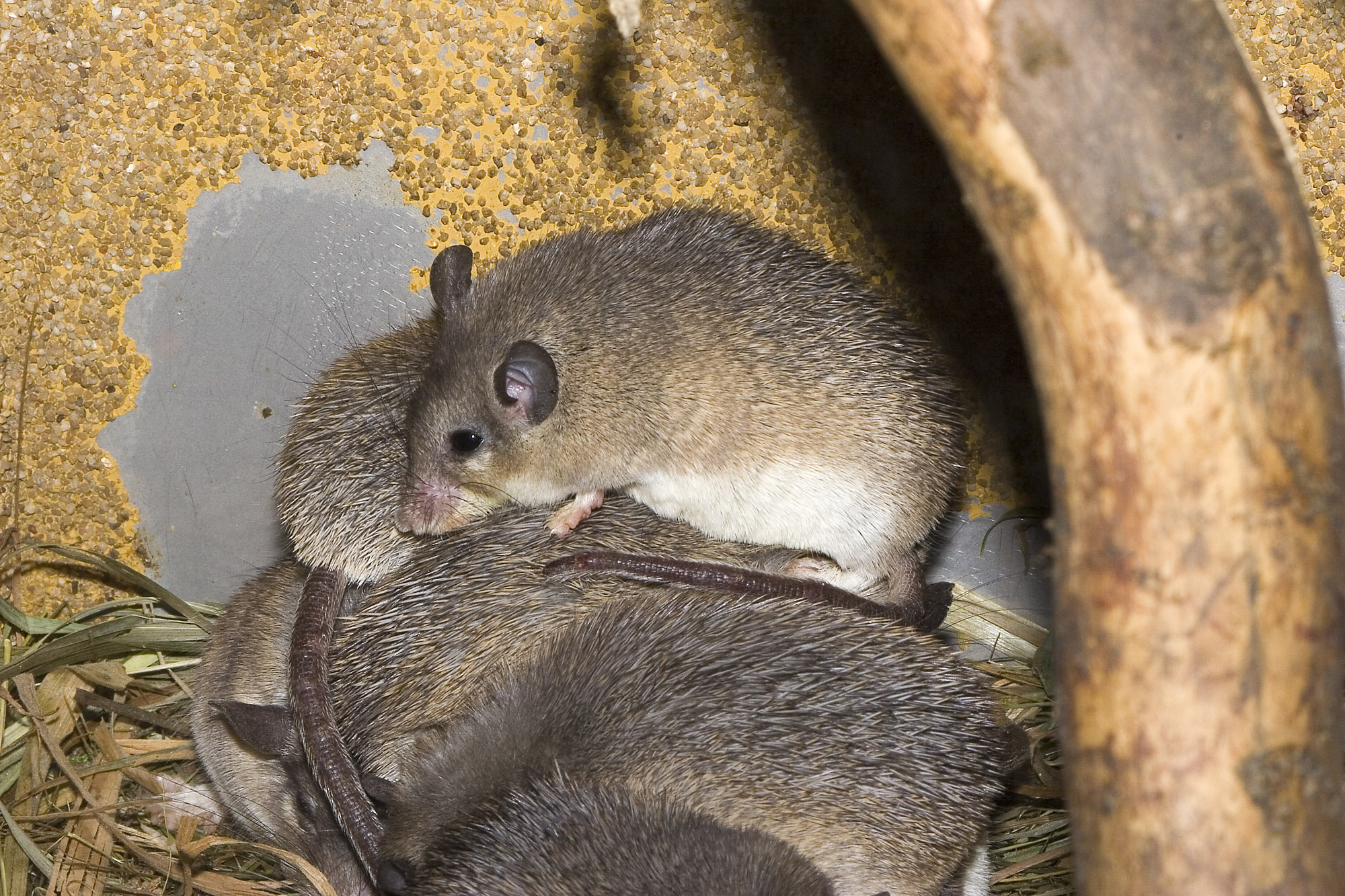
A. cilicicus

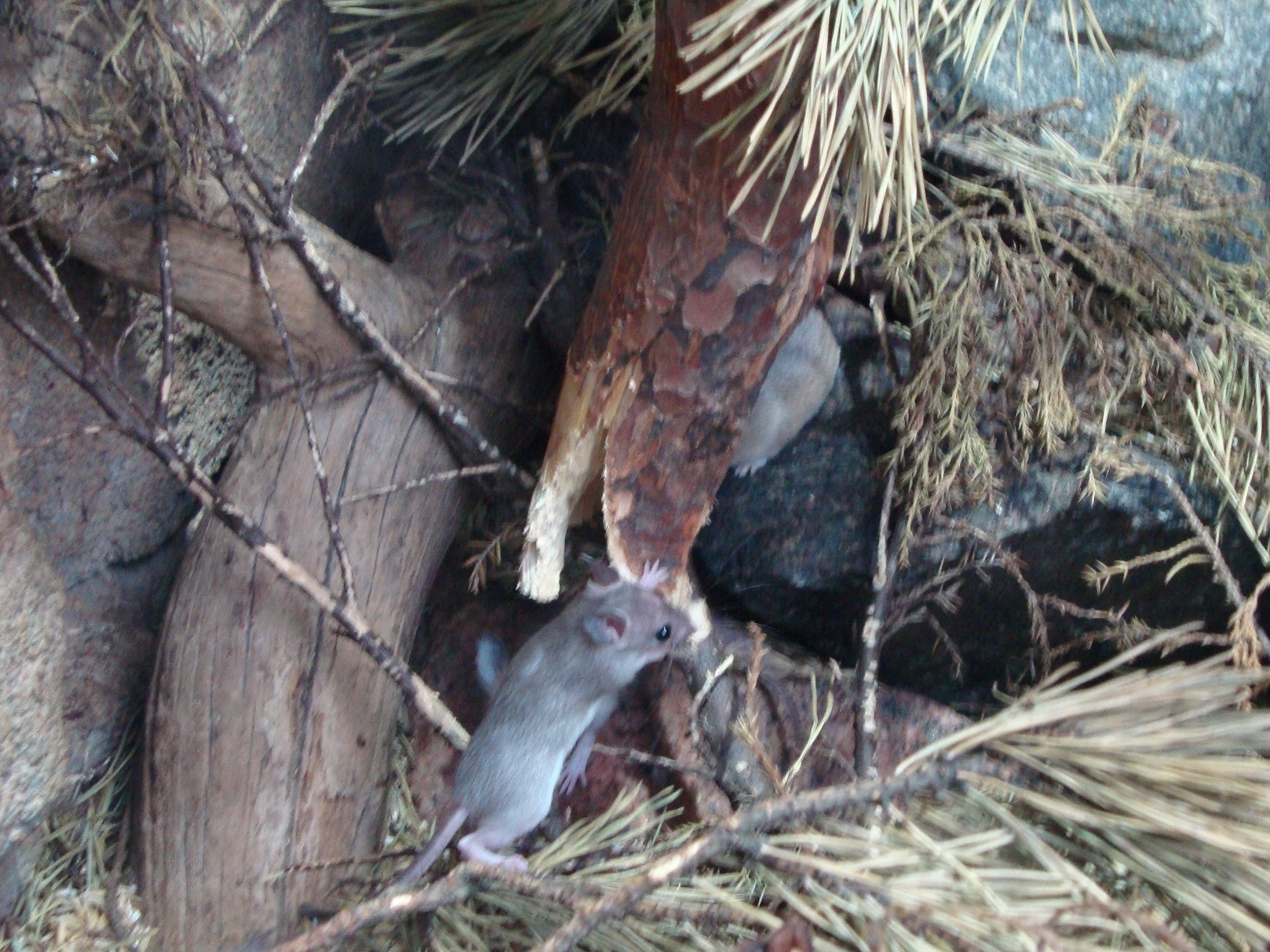
A. cilicicus in Africasia House at Korkeasaari Zoo in Helsinki

== Distribution ==
This species is endemic to Turkey. It is known only from the type locality 17 km east of the Turkish town of Silifke, located in the south-west of Mersin, along the southern coast of Turkey.

== Habitat ==
Its natural habitat is temperate forests, but this species is also lives close to human dwellings.

== Conservation status ==
A. cilicicus was previously listed as Critically Endangered, but is now considered Data Deficient because of taxonomic issues, as it may be the same species as the widespread and common northeast Cairo spiny mouse, A. cahirinus.
