= Western Saharan spiny mouse =

Conservation status
- Least Concern (IUCN 3.1)

Scientific classification
- Kingdom: Animalia
- Phylum: Chordata
- Class: Mammalia
- Order: Rodentia
- Family: Muridae
- Genus: Acomys
- Species: A. airensis

Binomial name
- Acomys airensis Thomas & Hinton, 1921

Species of rodent

The Western Saharan spiny mouse or Aïr spiny mouse (Acomys airensis) is a species of small, insectivorous rodent in the family Muridae found arid regions of western Africa.

== Description ==
The Western Saharan spiny mouse is a small mouse with large ears, small eyes and a sharp snout. The fur on its back is tawny, each hair being grey at the base with a rufous sub-terminal band and a grey tip. It takes its name from a line of spiny hairs on the posterior part of the back; in older mice the spiny hairs spread forwards along the back towards the head. The ventral fur is white and separated cleanly from the flanks. There are small white patches under the eye and behind the ears.

== Distribution ==
The Western Saharan spiny mouse occurs north of the Niger River and has been recorded with certainty in southern Mauritania, Mali and Niger but may also occur in Chad, Western Sahara and southernmost parts of Algeria.

== Habitat ==
This species occurs in the Sahel savanna biogeographical zone, where it is found in rocky areas but also in gardens and even within buildings. It has also been found in a sandy area of the Inner Niger Delta. The maximum altitude at which it occurs is 1000 m above sea level.

== Habits ==
The Western Saharan spiny mouse is terrestrial and mainly nocturnal, although some have been recorded as active during the day. It probably rests in cracks and crevices in rocks rather than burrowing. In southern Mauritania pregnant females have been found in August and October. It is common and readily trapped in many areas. Barn owls appear to be major predators of these mice. The skin on the tail breaks off easily. Like other members of the genus Acomys, this mouse is omnivorous but mainly insectivorous.

== Taxonomy ==
This species was formerly considered conspecific with Cairo spiny mouse, Acomys cahirinus, but there are differences in the number of chromosomes. It may be conspecific with Chudeau's spiny mouse, Acomys chudeaui, from Morocco and, if that is the case, then the correct species name is Acomys chudeaui as the latter name has precedence.
