= Caudal =

Caudal may refer to:

== Anatomy ==
- Caudal (anatomical term) (from Latin cauda; tail), used to describe how close something is to the trailing end of an organism
- Caudal artery, the portion of the dorsal aorta of a vertebrate that passes into the tail
- Caudal cell mass, the aggregate of undifferentiated cells at the caudal end on the spine
- Caudal fin, the tail fin of a fish
- Caudal vertebrae, that make up the tail of tailed animals

== Places ==
- Caudal (comarca), an administrative division of Asturias, Spain
- Caudal (river), in northern Spain
- Caudal Hills, Antarctica

== Other uses ==
- Caudal (protein), a family of homeobox transcription factors
- Anne-Lise Caudal (born 1984), a French golfer

== See also ==
- Cauda (disambiguation)
