= Cauda (disambiguation) =

The cauda is a characteristic feature of songs in the conductus style of a cappella music.

Cauda may refer to:

- a tail-like protrusion of an aphid
- Gavdos, once known as Cauda, a Greek island

== See also ==
- Caudal (disambiguation)
