= Cyprus spiny mouse =

Conservation status
- Data Deficient (IUCN 3.1)

Scientific classification
- Kingdom: Animalia
- Phylum: Chordata
- Class: Mammalia
- Infraclass: Placentalia
- Order: Rodentia
- Family: Muridae
- Genus: Acomys
- Species: A. nesiotes

Binomial name
- Acomys nesiotes (Bate, 1903)

Species of rodent

The Cyprus spiny mouse (Acomys nesiotes) is a rodent endemic to Cyprus. These nocturnal animals are generally found in arid areas. After the last confirmed record in 1980, no significant surveys were conducted until four individuals were rediscovered in 2007. Due to limited population data, the species is classified as Data Deficient by the IUCN.

== Taxonomy ==
The Cyprus spiny mouse was described by Dorothea Bate in 1903 on the basis of specimens caught in the Kyrenia Mountains of Cyprus. The species is very poorly studied and poorly defined. Recent analyses of genetic data and the Cyprus spiny mouse's relationship with other species in the Acomys cahirinus complex suggest that the Cyprus spiny mouse actually represents a non-native population of Acomys cahirinus introduced to Cyprus by humans. However, pending further taxonomic work into relationships within the complex, the Cyprus spiny mouse is retained as a valid species.

== Description ==
The dorsal fur is dark grey and the ventral fur is white, with a brownish tint to the grey of the flanks. The bristles of fur are spiny and pale grey with dark ends. The tail is relatively short and thick, grey above and light below. The upper incisors are yellow.

== Distribution ==
There are two disjunct Cyprus spiny mouse populations on the island: one in the Troodos Mountains in the south and one in the Kyrenia Mountains in the north, separated by the Mesaoria Plain. The mouse inhabits rocky areas and limestone with macchia shrubland and scanty woodland at elevations of up to 1,220 m. It sometimes occurs near villages and generally shelters in rock crevices and cowsheds. Population density varies from less than one individual per hectare in the spring to over three per hectare in the fall.

== Conservation and ecology ==
The Cyprus spiny mouse feeds on carob leaves and bark, as well snails.

The mouse inhabits rocky areas and may be threatened by road building and construction in its range. It is listed as being data deficient on the IUCN Red List due to the paucity of information on its taxonomic status and population.
