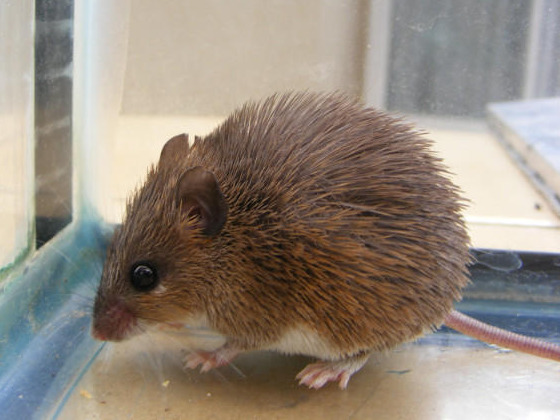

Conservation status
- Least Concern (IUCN 3.1)

Scientific classification
- Kingdom: Animalia
- Phylum: Chordata
- Class: Mammalia
- Order: Rodentia
- Family: Muridae
- Genus: Acomys
- Species: A. selousi

Binomial name
- Acomys selousi de Winton, 1896

= Acomys selousi =

Species of rodent

Acomys selousi, or Selous's spiny mouse, is a species of rodent in the family Muridae. It is found in Botswana, Mozambique, South Africa, and Zimbabwe.
