= Mullah spiny mouse =

Conservation status
- Least Concern (IUCN 3.1)

Scientific classification
- Kingdom: Animalia
- Phylum: Chordata
- Class: Mammalia
- Order: Rodentia
- Family: Muridae
- Genus: Acomys
- Species: A. mullah

Binomial name
- Acomys mullah Thomas, 1904

Species of rodent

The Mullah spiny mouse (Acomys mullah) is a species of rodent in the family Muridae found in Djibouti, Eritrea, Ethiopia, and Somalia. Its natural habitats are subtropical or tropical dry shrubland and rocky areas.
