= Louise's spiny mouse =

Conservation status
- Least Concern (IUCN 3.1)

Scientific classification
- Kingdom: Animalia
- Phylum: Chordata
- Class: Mammalia
- Order: Rodentia
- Family: Muridae
- Genus: Acomys
- Species: A. louisae

Binomial name
- Acomys louisae Thomas, 1896

Species of rodent

Louise's spiny mouse (Acomys louisae) is a species of rodent in the family Muridae. It is found in Djibouti, Ethiopia, Kenya, and Somalia. Its natural habitats are dry savanna, subtropical or tropical dry lowland grassland, and rocky areas.
