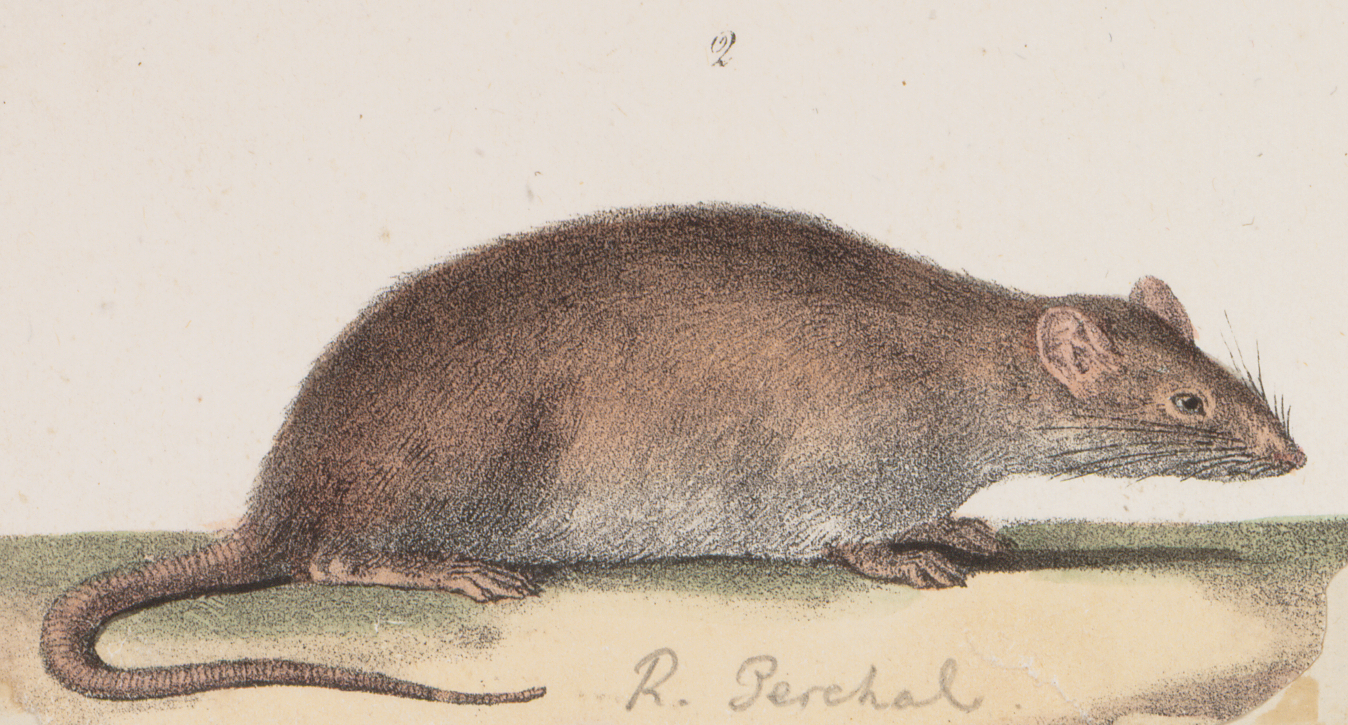

Conservation status
- Least Concern (IUCN 3.1)

Scientific classification
- Kingdom: Animalia
- Phylum: Chordata
- Class: Mammalia
- Order: Rodentia
- Family: Muridae
- Genus: Acomys
- Species: A. percivali

Binomial name
- Acomys percivali Dollman, 1911

= Percival's spiny mouse =

Species of rodent

Percival's spiny mouse (Acomys percivali) is a species of rodent in the family Muridae. It is found in Kenya, Somalia, South Sudan, and Uganda. Its natural habitats are dry savanna, subtropical or tropical dry shrubland, and rocky areas. It is one of two known species of mammals, the other being Acomys kempi, capable of completely regenerating damaged tissue, including hair follicles, skin, sweat glands, fur and cartilage.

== Classification ==
For the first time the species was described scientifically in 1911 by G. Dollman.

Body length (without tail) is 82–111 mm, tail length is 39–92 mm (tail makes up 76% of body length), ear length is 11–15 mm, hind foot length is 9–15 mm; body weight is 18-48 g.

== Habitat ==
It lives mainly in the lowlands within the Great Rift Valley of Africa. It is found up to 1000 m above sea level, especially in rocky areas covered with lava. It is an insectivorous animal.
