= Wilson's spiny mouse =

Conservation status
- Least Concern (IUCN 3.1)

Scientific classification
- Kingdom: Animalia
- Phylum: Chordata
- Class: Mammalia
- Order: Rodentia
- Family: Muridae
- Genus: Acomys
- Species: A. wilsoni

Binomial name
- Acomys wilsoni Thomas, 1892

Species of rodent

Wilson's spiny mouse (Acomys wilsoni) is a species of rodent in the family Muridae. It is found in Ethiopia, Kenya, Somalia, South Sudan, Tanzania, and Uganda. Its natural habitats are dry savanna, subtropical or tropical dry shrubland, and rocky areas. Molecular evidence suggests that spiny mice (Acomys) are genetically more closely related to gerbils (Gerbillinae) than they are to actual mice (Muridae) based on their murine morphology.
