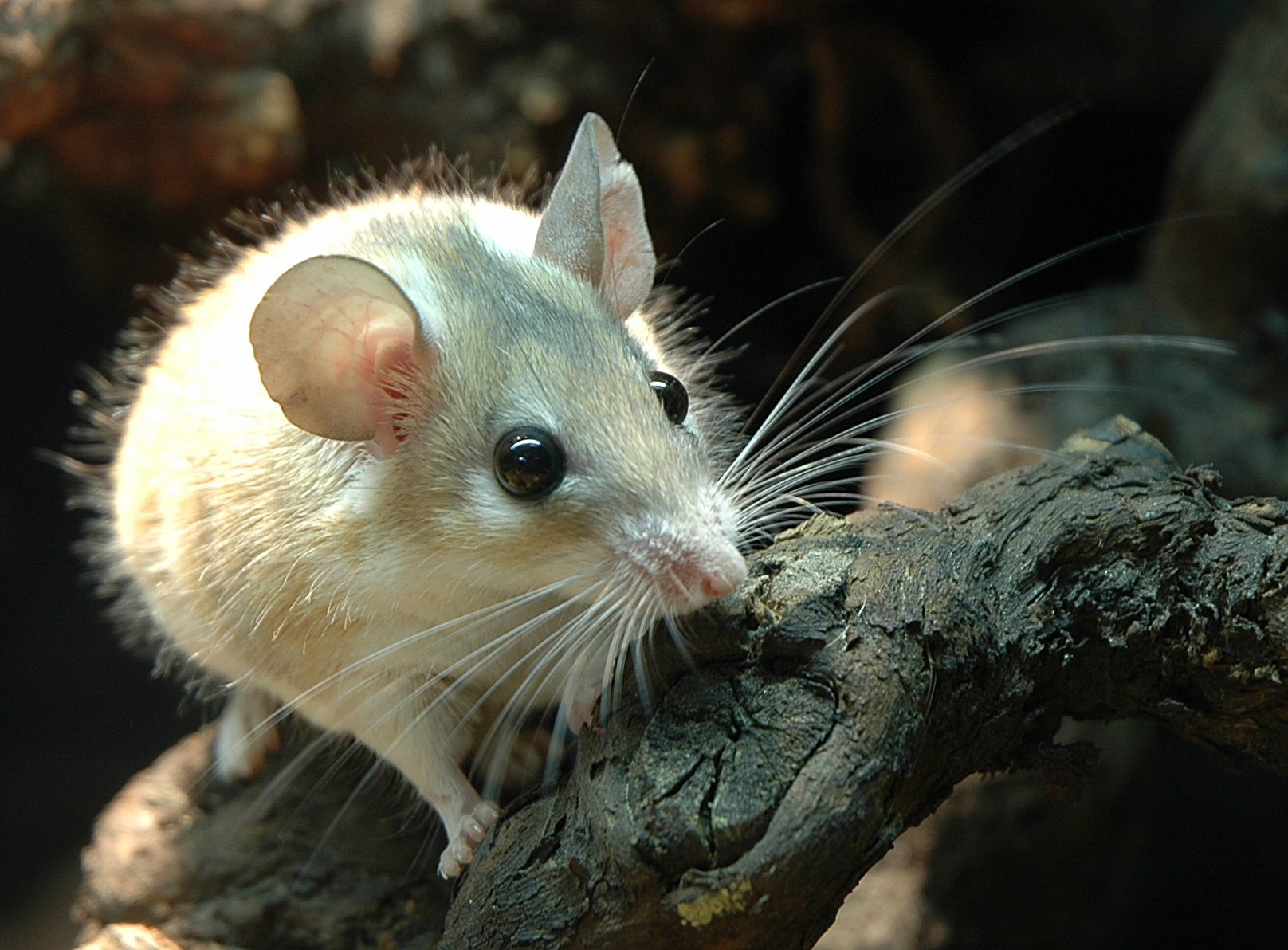
- Eastern spiny mouse (Acomys dimidiatus)

Scientific classification
- Kingdom: Animalia
- Phylum: Chordata
- Class: Mammalia
- Order: Rodentia
- Family: Muridae
- Subfamily: Deomyinae
- Genus: Acomys; I. Geoffroy Saint-Hilaire, 1838

Type species
- Mus cahirinus

Species
- 21, see text

= Spiny mouse =

Spiny mouse Temporal range: Early Pliocene – Recent

Genus of rodents

The term spiny mouse refers to any species of rodent within the genus Acomys. Similar in appearance to mice of the genus Mus, spiny mice are small mammals with bare tails which contain osteoderms, a rare feature in mammals. Their coats are endowed with unusually stiff guard hairs similar to the spines of a hedgehog; this trait is the source of the common name, spiny mouse.

Despite their anatomic similarity to members of the genus Mus, genetic evidence suggests that the African spiny mice may be more closely related to gerbils than to common mice.

== Classification ==
Genus Acomys – spiny mice

- Western Saharan spiny mouse, Acomys airensis
- Cairo spiny mouse, Acomys cahirinus
- Chudeau's spiny mouse, Acomys chudeaui
- Asia Minor spiny mouse, Acomys cilicicus
- Gray spiny mouse, Acomys cineraceus
- Eastern spiny mouse, Acomys dimidiatus
- Fiery spiny mouse, Acomys ignitus
- Johan's spiny mouse, Acomys johannis
- Kemp's spiny mouse, Acomys kempi
- Louise's spiny mouse, Acomys louisae
- Crete spiny mouse, Acomys minous
- Mullah spiny mouse, Acomys mullah
- Muze spiny mouse, Acomys muzei
- Cyprus spiny mouse, Acomys nesiotes
- Nguru spiny mouse, Acomys ngurui
- Percival's spiny mouse, Acomys percivali
- Golden spiny mouse, Acomys russatus
- Selous's spiny mouse, Acomys selousi
- Seurat's spiny mouse, Acomys seurati
- Southern African spiny mouse, Acomys spinosissimus
- Cape spiny mouse, Acomys subspinosus
- Wilson's spiny mouse, Acomys wilsoni

== As exotic pets ==
Though African spiny mice originated in the deserts of Africa, they are frequently kept as exotic pets in other parts of the world, particularly Western nations such as the United States. In the pet trade, they are most commonly referred to as Egyptian spiny mice or, more simply, spiny mice. Though these animals are similar to pet mice and rats, the tail of a spiny mouse is much more delicate. Therefore, the spiny mouse should never be picked up by its tail and should be handled with care to avoid a degloving injury. Their diet is also rather hard to maintain because their bodies have odd reactions to certain foods.

=== Housing ===
Due to their desert origin, spiny mice thrive at hot temperatures and should be maintained around 27 °C (81 °F). These animals are very social and should always be housed in groups when possible. As spiny mice are prone to obesity, it is important to provide ample space and environmental enrichment to encourage exercise.

=== Reproduction ===
Gestation length is between 38 and 42 days. Litters normally consist of 2 to 3 pups, but females may have up to 6 pups in a single litter. Other females within the social group may assist in the birthing process and tend to the newborns. Pups are born with their eyes open; they will begin to leave the nesting area at about 3 days of age. Babies are weaned around 5 to 6 weeks and reach sexual maturity at about 6 to 9 weeks. A female can conceive throughout the year and may produce up to 9 litters in a year. Lifespan for spiny mice is 4 to 7 years. The mother is able to become pregnant right after birth.

One species of spiny mouse, the Cairo spiny mouse (A. cahirinus), was discovered to have a menstrual cycle, which would make them important as a model organism to study menstruation and reproductive disorders, as Mus musculus, the common laboratory mouse, does not menstruate.

== Diabetes ==
Captive housing of spiny mice in the mid-1960s uncovered their sensitivity to developing diabetes. That is, spiny mice were kept as pets and maintained on bird food consisting of fat-rich pumpkin, sesame, and sunflower seeds. This diet was associated with obesity, glucosuria, and ketosis. Further studies, in the Institute of Biochemistry in Geneva, revealed that spiny mice manifest low insulin secretion capacity, low response to glucose, and faint first-phase insulin release, despite pancreatic islet hypertrophy and hyperplasia. Notably, they do not show the common symptom of insulin resistance. A. russatus is not known to develop symptoms of diabetes under a similar diet.

== Autotomy and tissue regeneration ==
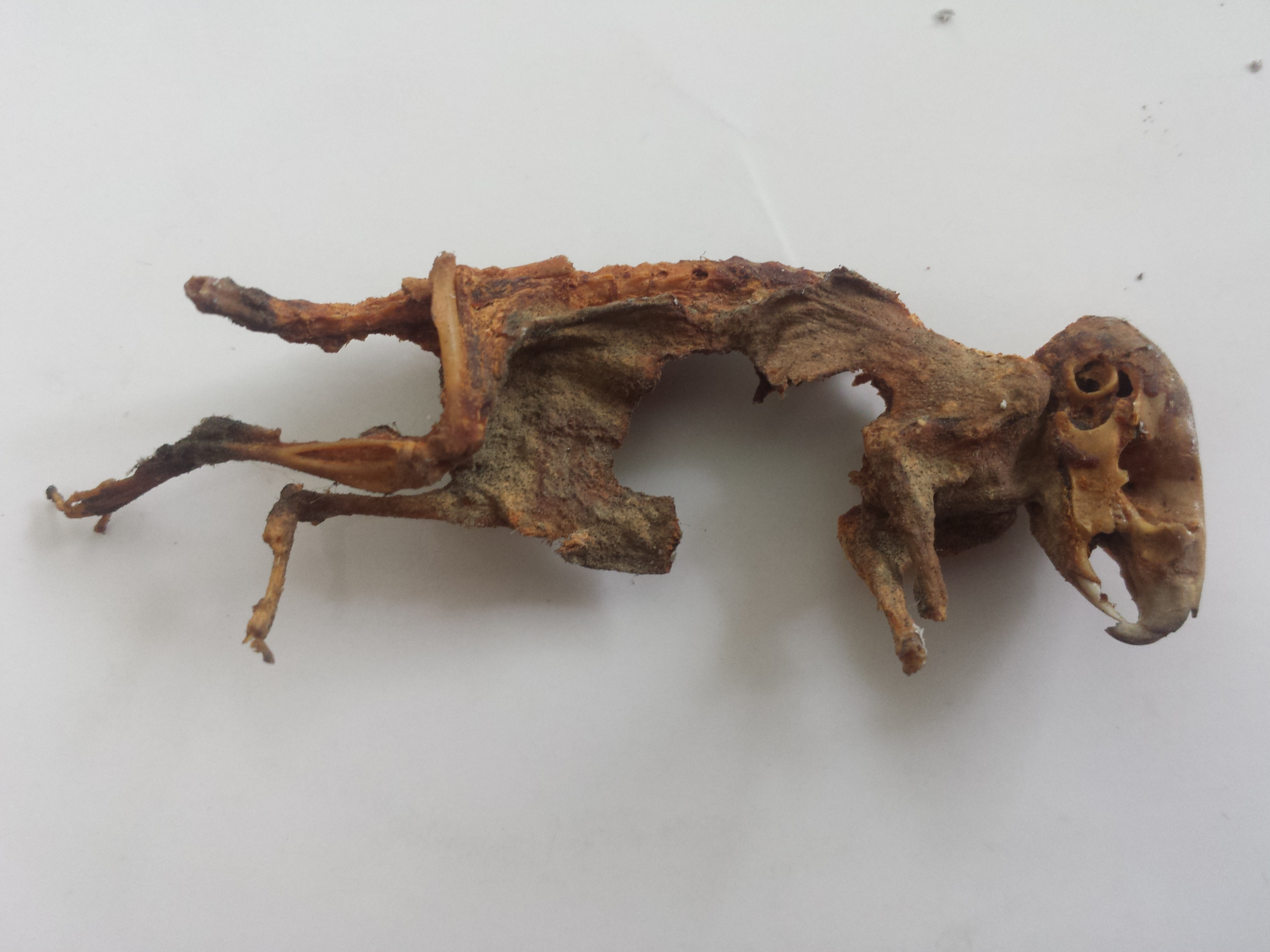
Desiccated spiny mouse (Acomys) corpse. Note the shortened tail, probably the result of a degloving injury.

All studied species of spiny mice, Acomys kempi, A. percivali, A. cahirinus, A. dimidiatus, and A. russatus, are capable of autotomic release of skin upon being captured by a predator. To date, spiny mice are the only mammals known to do so. They can completely regenerate the automatically released or otherwise damaged skin tissue – regrowing hair follicles, skin, sweat glands, fur and cartilage with little or no scarring. It is believed that the corresponding regeneration genes could also function in humans.

In a research article published on May 16, 2017, in eLife, a team from the University of Kentucky described the role of macrophages in epimorphic regeneration. The subtype of macrophages found in African spiny mice produces a different immune response than the subtype that elicits scarring.

== Disease ==
Because spiny mice are highly prevalent throughout Africa and rodents are known to be carriers of disease, an investigation into whether spiny mice may carry disease was done in Egypt in 1912. In this investigation it was determined that Acomys harbored only a tenth of the number of fleas that wild rats do and is thus of little importance of spreading disease.
