= Kemp's spiny mouse =

Conservation status
- Least Concern (IUCN 3.1)

Scientific classification
- Kingdom: Animalia
- Phylum: Chordata
- Class: Mammalia
- Order: Rodentia
- Family: Muridae
- Genus: Acomys
- Species: A. kempi

Binomial name
- Acomys kempi Dollman, 1911

Species of rodent

Kemp's spiny mouse (Acomys kempi) is a species of rodent in the family Muridae. It is found in Kenya, Somalia, and Tanzania. Its natural habitats are dry savanna and rocky areas. It is one of only two mammals, the other being Acomys percivali, which can shed its skin. In addition (and as a result), it is known to be capable of completely regenerating damaged tissue, including hair follicles, skin, sweat glands, fur and cartilage.
