= Caudal artery =

The caudal artery is the portion of the dorsal aorta of a vertebrate that passes into the tail.

It is analogous to the median sacral artery in humans.
