= Chudeau's spiny mouse =

Scientific classification
- Kingdom: Animalia
- Phylum: Chordata
- Class: Mammalia
- Order: Rodentia
- Family: Muridae
- Genus: Acomys
- Species: A. chudeaui

Binomial name
- Acomys chudeaui Kollmann, 1911

Species of rodent

Chudeau's spiny mouse (Acomys chudeaui) is a species of rodent in the family Muridae found in Algeria, Mali, Mauritania, Morocco, and Niger. Its natural habitats are rocky areas and hot deserts.
