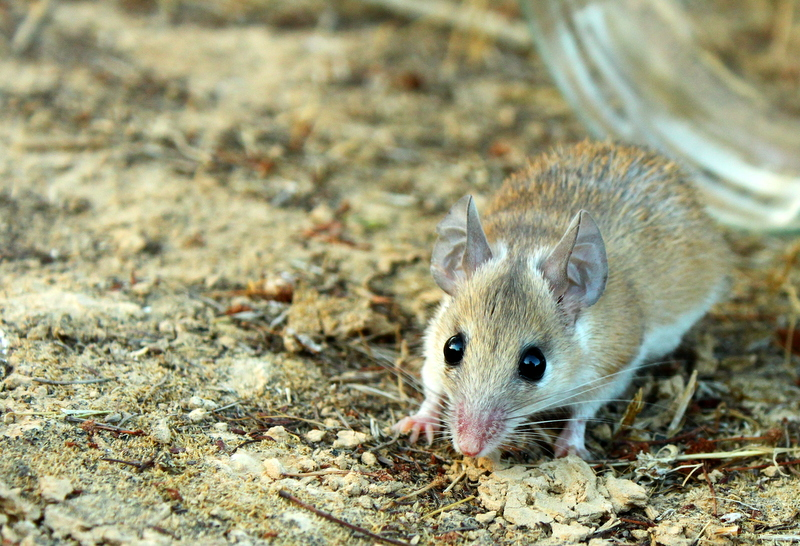

Conservation status
- Least Concern (IUCN 3.1)

Scientific classification
- Kingdom: Animalia
- Phylum: Chordata
- Class: Mammalia
- Infraclass: Placentalia
- Order: Rodentia
- Family: Muridae
- Genus: Acomys
- Species: A. cahirinus

Binomial name
- Acomys cahirinus (É. Geoffrey, 1803)

Synonyms
- Acomys chudeaui

= Cairo spiny mouse =

Species of rodent

The Cairo spiny mouse (Acomys cahirinus), also known as the common spiny mouse, Egyptian spiny mouse, or Arabian spiny mouse, is a nocturnal species of rodent in the family Muridae. It is found in Africa north of the Sahara Desert, where its natural habitats are rocky areas and hot deserts. It is omnivorous, feeding on seeds, desert plants, snails, and insects. It is a gregarious animal and lives in small family groups. It is the first and only known rodent species that exhibit spontaneous decidualization and menstruation.

== Description ==
The Cairo spiny mouse grows to a head and body length of about 3.75 to 5 in (95 to 127 mm) with a tail of much the same length. Adults weigh between 1.5 and 3 oz (43 and 85 g). The colour of the Cairo spiny mouse is sandy-brown or greyish-brown above and whitish beneath. A line of spine-like bristles run along the ridge of the back. The snout is slender and pointed, the eyes are large, the ears are large and slightly pointed and the tail is devoid of hairs.

The spiny mouse is known to have relatively weak skin, compared to Mus musculus, and tail autotomy.

== Distribution and habitat ==
The Cairo spiny mouse is native to northern Africa with its range extending from Mauritania, Morocco, and Algeria in the west to Sudan, Ethiopia, Eritrea, and Egypt in the east at altitudes up to about 1,500 m (4,900 ft). It lives in dry stony habitats with sparse vegetation and is often found near human dwellings. It is common around cliffs and canyons and in gravelly plains with shrubby vegetation. It is not usually found in sandy habitats, but may be present among date palms.

== Behaviour ==
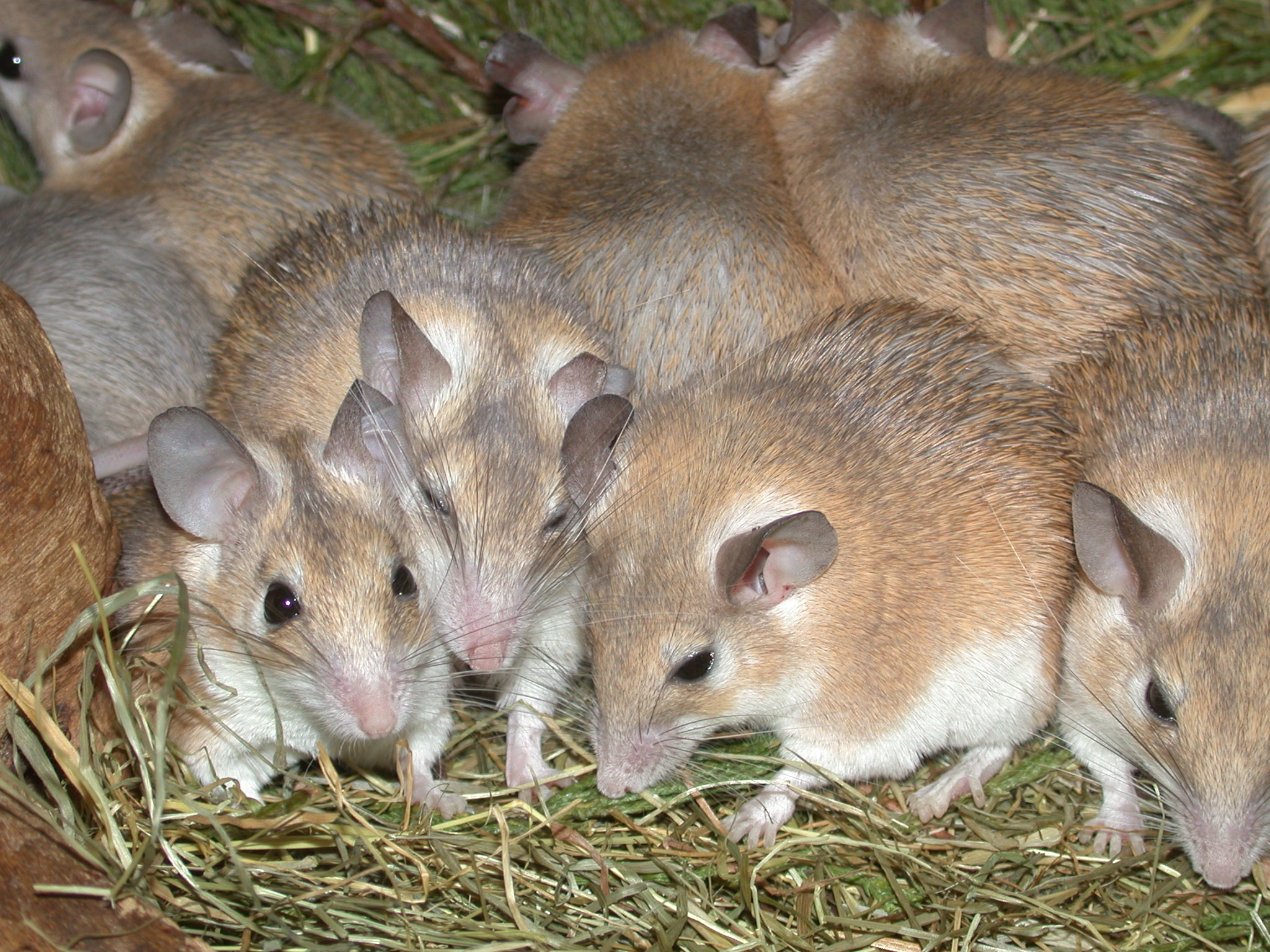
Captive specimens at Birmingham Nature Centre

Cairo spiny mice are social animals and live in a group with a dominant male. Breeding mostly takes place in the rainy season, between September and April, when availability of food is greater. The gestation period is five to six weeks, which is long for a mouse, and the young are well-developed when they are born. At this time, they are already covered with short fur and their eyes are open, and they soon start exploring their surroundings. The adults in the group cooperate in caring for the young, with lactating females feeding any of the group offspring. Females may become pregnant again immediately after giving birth, and have three or four litters of up to five young in a year. The juveniles mature at two to three months of age.

Cairo spiny mice live in burrows or rock crevices and are mostly terrestrial, but they can also clamber about in low bushes. They are nocturnal and omnivorous, eating anything edible they can find. Their diet includes seeds, nuts, fruit, green leaves, insects, spiders, molluscs, and carrion. When they live in the vicinity of humans, they consume crops, grain, and stored food. They sometimes enter houses, especially in winter, and dislike cold weather.

The fruit of Ochradenus baccatus (= Reseda baccata) has pleasant tasting flesh, but distasteful seeds. The Cairo spiny mouse consumes the fruits, but spits the seeds out intact and thus acts as an efficient seed dispersal agent for this plant.

The Cairo spiny mouse is a host of the Acanthocephalan intestinal parasite Moniliformis acomysi.

== Status ==
The Cairo spiny mouse has a wide distribution and occupies diverse habitats. It is common and the population size large, so the IUCN, in its Red List of Threatened Species, lists it as being of "Least Concern".

== Research interest ==
The spiny mouse is used for research in diabetes, development, regeneration, and menstruation.

The spiny mouse is also the first known rodent species to exhibit spontaneous decidualization and menstruation, potentially serving as a great candidate model to study menstrual related diseases. It exhibits a 9-day cycle, and is the first rodent found to have such a cycle. As of 2017, gene sequencing has been underway to investigate this, and other unique physiological traits displayed by this species.
