= Denervation =

Loss of nerve supply

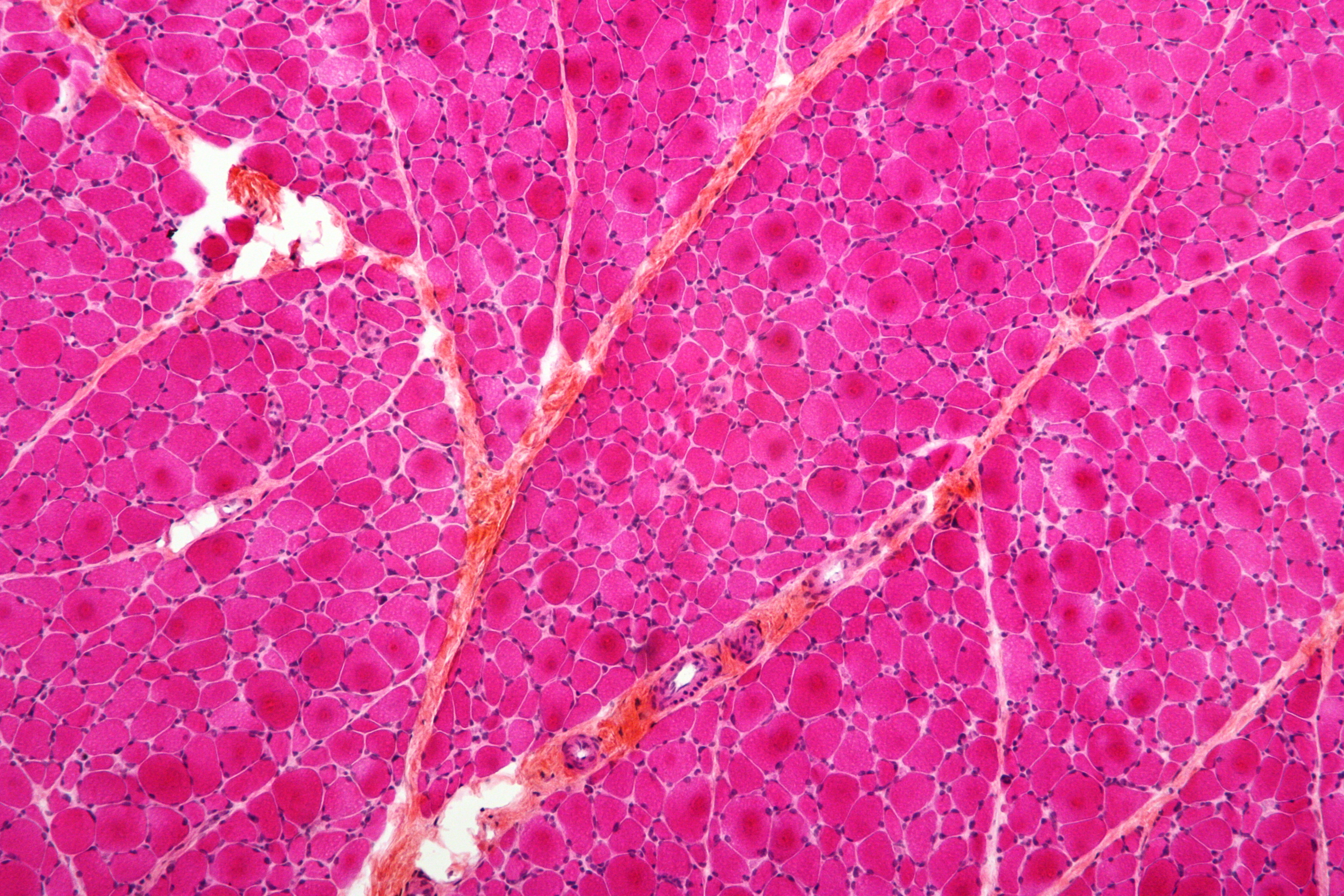
This magnified image of type 2 muscle fibers shows denervation atrophy occurring at the white spaces at the top left and bottom center of the image. The white space represents a disruption of the nerve fibers, resulting in a loss of nerve supply to the muscle fibers.

Denervation is any loss of nerve supply regardless of the cause. If the nerves lost to denervation are part of neural communication to an organ system or for a specific tissue function, alterations to or compromise of physiological functioning can occur. Denervation can result from an injury or be a symptom of a disorder like amyotrophic lateral sclerosis (ALS), post-polio syndrome, or neuropathic postural orthostatic tachycardia syndrome (POTS). Intentional denervation is a valuable surgical technique for managing some medical conditions, such as renal denervation in the setting of uncontrolled hypertension. Pathological denervation, by contrast, is associated with serious health sequelae, including increased infection susceptibility and tissue dysfunction.

== Causes ==
The loss of nerve supply can be caused by injury, disorders, or result from a surgical procedure.

=== Injuries ===
Denervation can occur as a consequence of nerve injury. The three primary categories of nerve injury are neurapraxia, axonotmesis, and neurotmesis, each corresponding to varying degrees of damage and potential for recovery. In cases of nerve injury, the brain demonstrates an impressive ability to rewire or reorganize its neuronal circuitry. This plasticity enables the brain to compensate for the disruptions in neuronal communication that result from the injury.

=== Disorders ===
Denervation processes are strongly associated with the symptoms experienced in post-polio syndrome. Individuals with post-polio syndrome undergo a continuous cycle of denervation and reinnervation that occurs after acute poliomyelitis. Over time, this cycle leads to an increase in the size of motor units in skeletal muscle fibers. Eventually, the motor unit areas grow to a point where reinnervation is no longer possible, resulting in uncompensated denervation of the motor units. This ultimately leads to muscle atrophy and myasthenia. Following an acute poliovirus infection, symptoms such as fatigue, asthenia, and pain are believed to be linked to muscle denervation.

Much like post-polio syndrome, ALS also has similar symptoms of motor neurodegeneration leading to general weakness and, in some cases, paralysis. The type of symptoms experienced can depend on which areas of the body experience the loss in nerve supply. This denervation process is different from post-polio syndrome in that it involves only upper and lower motor neuron degeneration and does not involve constant reinnervation and denervation.

=== Surgical procedures ===
In addition to the management of peripheral nerve injury, denervation is used as a medical procedure for various benefits resulting from eliminating nerve supply to a specific area of the body. Renal denervation involves using radio frequency or ultrasound to eliminate the sympathetic nerve supply to the kidney wall, aiming to lower blood pressure and treat chronic hypertension. Renal denervation has become less common in recent years due to new evidence indicating that the procedure does not significantly lower blood pressure. Additionally, there are recommendations against its use, as there has been insufficient proof demonstrating that renal denervation effectively reduces blood pressure.

Other prevalent surgical procedures involve intentionally reducing nerve supply to treat a variety of disorders. In a sympathectomy, a sympathetic ganglion is surgically removed to treat hyperhidrosis(excessive sweating). Surgical or radiologic ablation of the carotid sinus nerve is used to treat carotid sinus hypersensitivity. In a vagotomy, the vagus nerve is surgically removed to treat peptic ulcer disease by reducing stomach acid. In a rhizotomy, nerve fibers in the spinal cord are destroyed with the intent of eliminating chronic myalgia.

== Physiological differences ==
In regard to skeletal muscle denervation there are two distinct diagnoses: entrapment and compressive neuropathies or non-entrapment neuropathies. Entrapment and compressive neuropathy syndromes occur due to compression and/or constriction on a specific location for a segment of a single nerve or multiple nerve sites. This entrapment or compression can be diagnosed based on multiple factors including physical examination, electrodiagnostic test and clinical history.

Following denervation, muscular atrophy and degeneration occurs within affected skeletal muscle tissue. Within the skeletal tissue is observable progressive loss of weight of denervated muscles as well as reduction in muscle fiber size and quantity. These muscles exhibit a slowing of contraction speed, a reduction of developed tension, and twitch force.

Magnetic resonance imaging (MRI) and high-resolution ultrasonography (US) are two clinical imaging examinations performed to classify the different diagnoses. Ultrasonography is advantageous with the evaluation of peripheral nerve resolutions while Magnetic Resonance Imaging is more sensitive in regard to signal intensity changes of the muscle.

Denervation affects the muscle activation process that is brought on by the development and propagation of an action potential and the ensuing release of calcium. It is found that there is an increase with calcium reuptake because of changes within sarcoplasmic reticulum morphology and structure. As a result, there is a decrease in amplitude and velocity of impulse conduction with an increase in muscle spike duration.

In clinical and experimental studies there is an observed increase in muscle excitability in electrical currents involving chemical actions, while there is a decrease in excitability to current associated with electrical induction in denervated muscles. Changes in the resting membrane potential involving denervated muscles presents mild depolarization when a muscle contraction stimulus is present. While there is no immediate change involving resting and action potential, there is an increase with membrane resistance. After prolonged denervation, it is revealed that resting membrane potential over time is reduced while action potentials progressively decreased and become slower. Acetylcholine is a neurotransmitter that becomes supersensitive in the presence of denervated muscle. Upon injection of acetylcholine, a slower contractile response, which is drastically under action potential threshold, is elicited.

== Reinnervation possibilities ==
Denervated muscles have shown the ability to survive after periods of denervation or in the case of a damaged nerve. The size of the nerve and its ability to function can be maintained if it is electrically stimulated soon after denervation, in clinical experiments. home-based functional electrical stimulation has been shown to rescue muscles which have experienced severe atrophy as a result of denervation. This process involves electrically stimulating the nerves innervating the affected part of the body, using electrodes placed on the skin.

For muscles that cannot be rescued via home-based functional electrical stimulation, an Italian study suggests that, at some point in the future, the following techniques may be applicable: they must first have induction and separation of autologous myogenic cells. This can be completed either by in vivo marcaine infiltration of muscle tissue that can then be grown in vitro, or have in vitro induction of autologous adipose tissue followed by selection of myogenic stem cells that can be recreated in vivo. The new autologous myogenic stem cells will be injected, proliferated and differentiated into new mature muscle fibers. Functional properties of these newly created muscle fibers will be induced via surface electrodes and an external neuromodulator.
