= Frostbite =

Effect of low temperature on skin and other tissues

- Other names: Frostnip
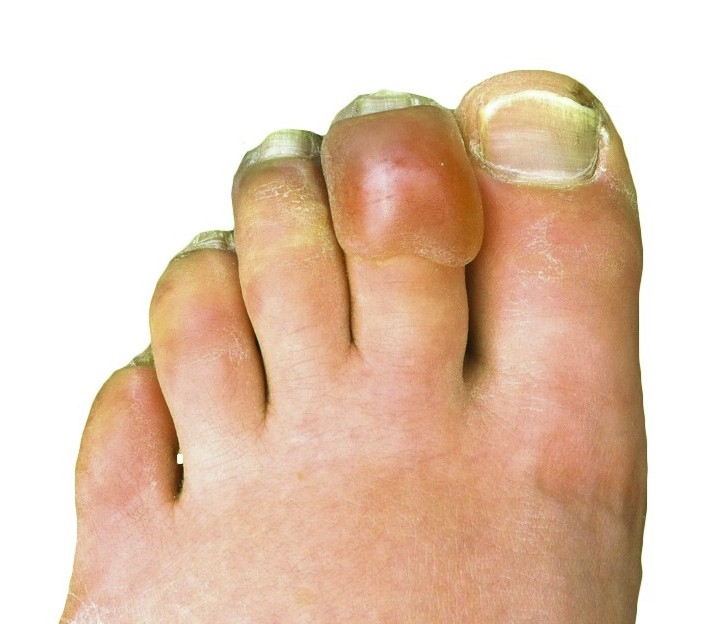
- Frostbitten toes two to three days after mountain climbing
- Specialty: Dermatology, emergency medicine, orthopedics
- Symptoms: Numbness, feeling cold, clumsiness, pale color
- Complications: Hypothermia, compartment syndrome
- Types: Superficial, deep
- Causes: Temperatures below freezing
- Risk factors: Alcohol, smoking, mental health problems, certain medications, prior cold injury
- Diagnostic method: Based on symptoms
- Differential diagnosis: Frostnip, pernio, trench foot
- Prevention: Avoid cold, wear proper clothing, maintain hydration and nutrition, stay active without becoming exhausted
- Treatment: Rewarming, medication, surgery
- Medication: Ibuprofen, tetanus vaccine, iloprost, thrombolytics
- Frequency: Unknown

Frostbite is an injury to skin or other living tissue that is allowed to freeze, especially affecting the fingers, toes, nose, ears, cheeks and chin. Most often, frostbite occurs in the hands and feet, often preceded by frostnip, a paling or reddening of a body part as its blood vessels constrict that tingles, feels very cold, or simply feels numb. This may be followed by the clumsiness and white or bluish, waxy-looking skin that evidence full-blown frostbite. Swelling or blistering may occur following treatment. Complications may include hypothermia or compartment syndrome.

People who are exposed to low temperatures for prolonged periods, such as winter sports enthusiasts, military personnel, and the homeless, are at greatest risk. Other risk factors include drinking alcohol, smoking, mental health problems, certain medications, and prior injuries due to cold. The underlying mechanism involves injury from ice crystals and blood clots in small blood vessels following thawing. Diagnosis is based on symptoms. Severity may be divided into superficial (first and second degree) and deep (third and fourth degree). A bone scan or MRI may help in determining the extent of injury.

Prevention consists of wearing proper, fully-covering clothing, avoiding low temperatures and wind, maintaining hydration and nutrition, and sufficient physical activity to maintain core temperature without exhaustion. Treatment is by rewarming, immersion in warm water (near body temperature), or body contact, and should be done only when a consistent temperature can be maintained so that refreezing is not a risk. Rapid heating or cooling should be avoided since it could potentially cause burning or heart stress. Rubbing or applying force to the affected areas should be avoided as it may cause further damage such as abrasions. The use of ibuprofen and tetanus toxoid is recommended for pain relief or to reduce swelling or inflammation. For severe injuries, iloprost or thrombolytics may be used. Surgery, including amputation, is sometimes necessary.

Evidence of frostbite occurring in humans dates back 5,000 years. Evidence was documented in a pre-Columbian mummy discovered in the Andes. The number of annual cases of frostbite is unknown. Rates may be as high as 40% a year among those who mountaineer. The most common age group affected is those 30 to 50 years old. Frostbite has also played an important role in a number of military conflicts. Its first formal description was in 1813 by Dominique Jean Larrey, a physician in Napoleon's army, during its invasion of Russia. Frostbite reports were largely military until the late 1950s.

== Signs and symptoms ==
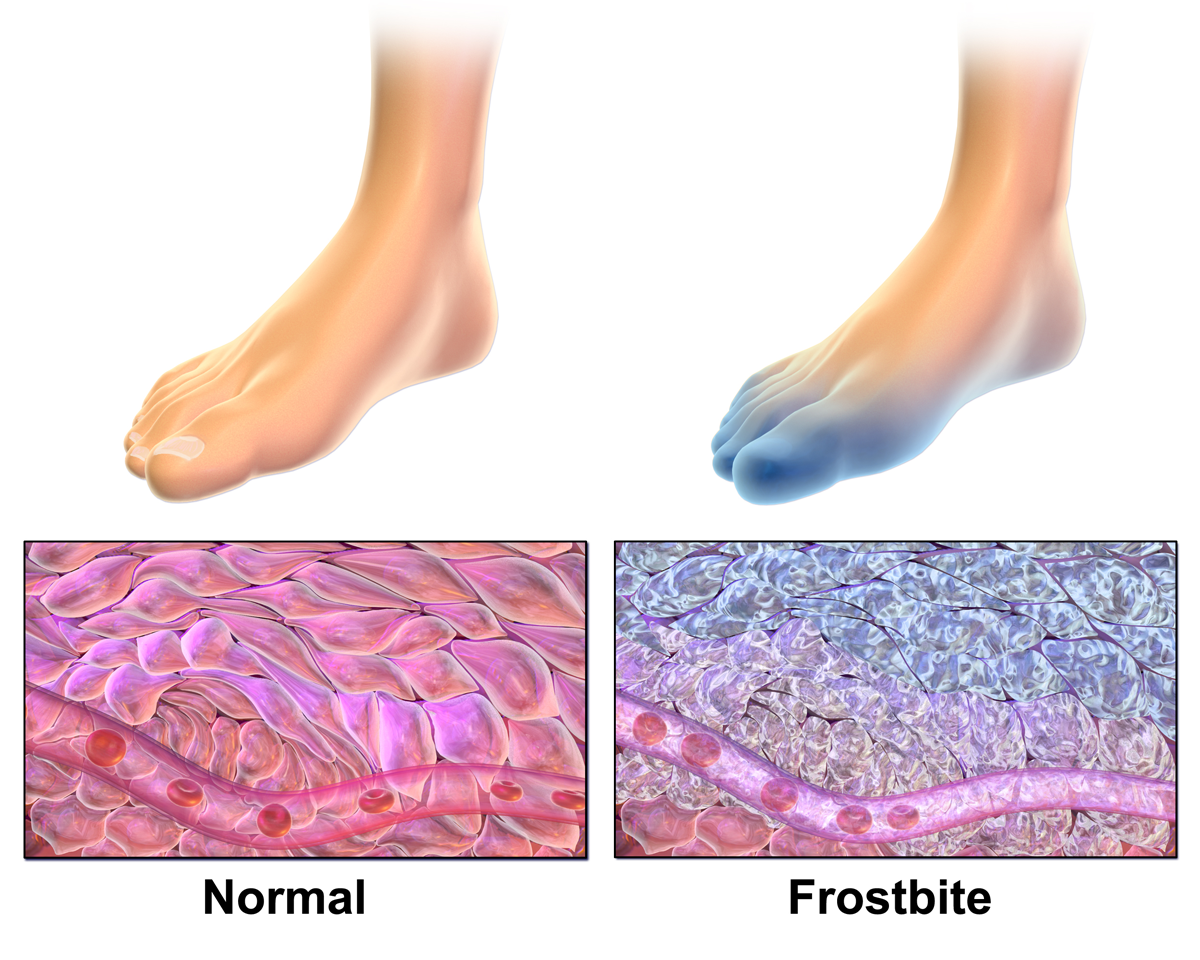
Frostbite

Areas that are usually affected include cheeks, ears, nose and fingers and toes. Frostbite is often preceded by frostnip. The symptoms of frostbite progress with prolonged exposure to cold. Historically, frostbite has been classified by degrees according to skin and sensation changes, similar to burn classifications. However, the degrees do not correspond to the amount of long-term damage. A simplification of this system of classification is superficial (first or second degree) or deep injury (third or fourth degree).

=== First degree ===
- First-degree frostbite is superficial, surface skin damage that is usually not permanent.
- Early on, the primary symptom is loss of feeling in the skin. In the affected areas, the skin is numb, waxy, and possibly swollen, with a reddened border.
- In the weeks after injury, the skin's surface may slough off.

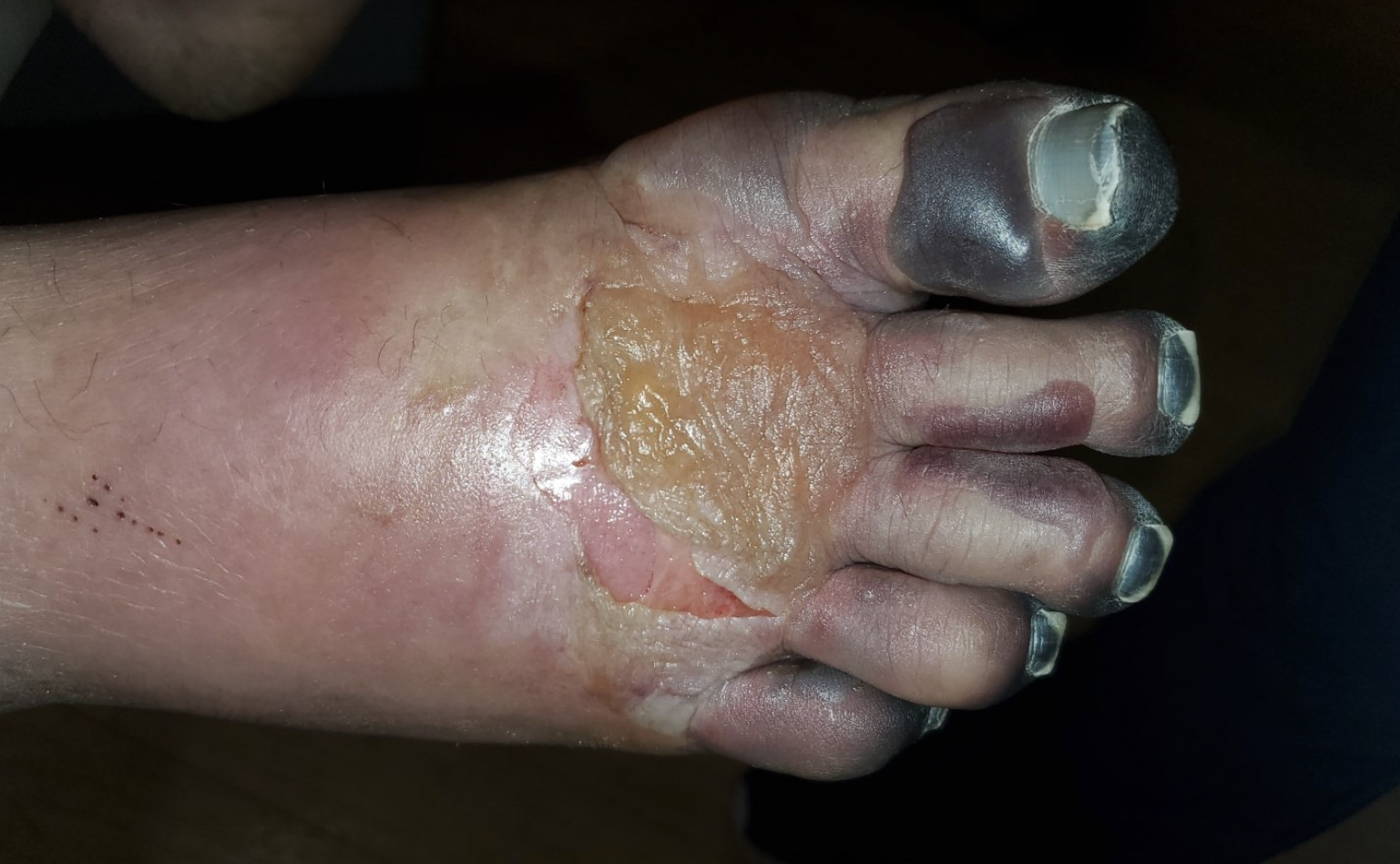
Third-degree frostbite developing. Doppler arterial ultrasound showed adequate perfusion to the foot with no blood flow to the toes. Gangrene was still demarcating, i.e., separating dead from living tissue.

=== Second degree ===
- In second-degree frostbite, the skin develops clear blisters early on, and its surface hardens.
- In the weeks after injury, this hardened, blistered skin dries, blackens, and peels.
- At this stage, lasting cold sensitivity and numbness can develop.

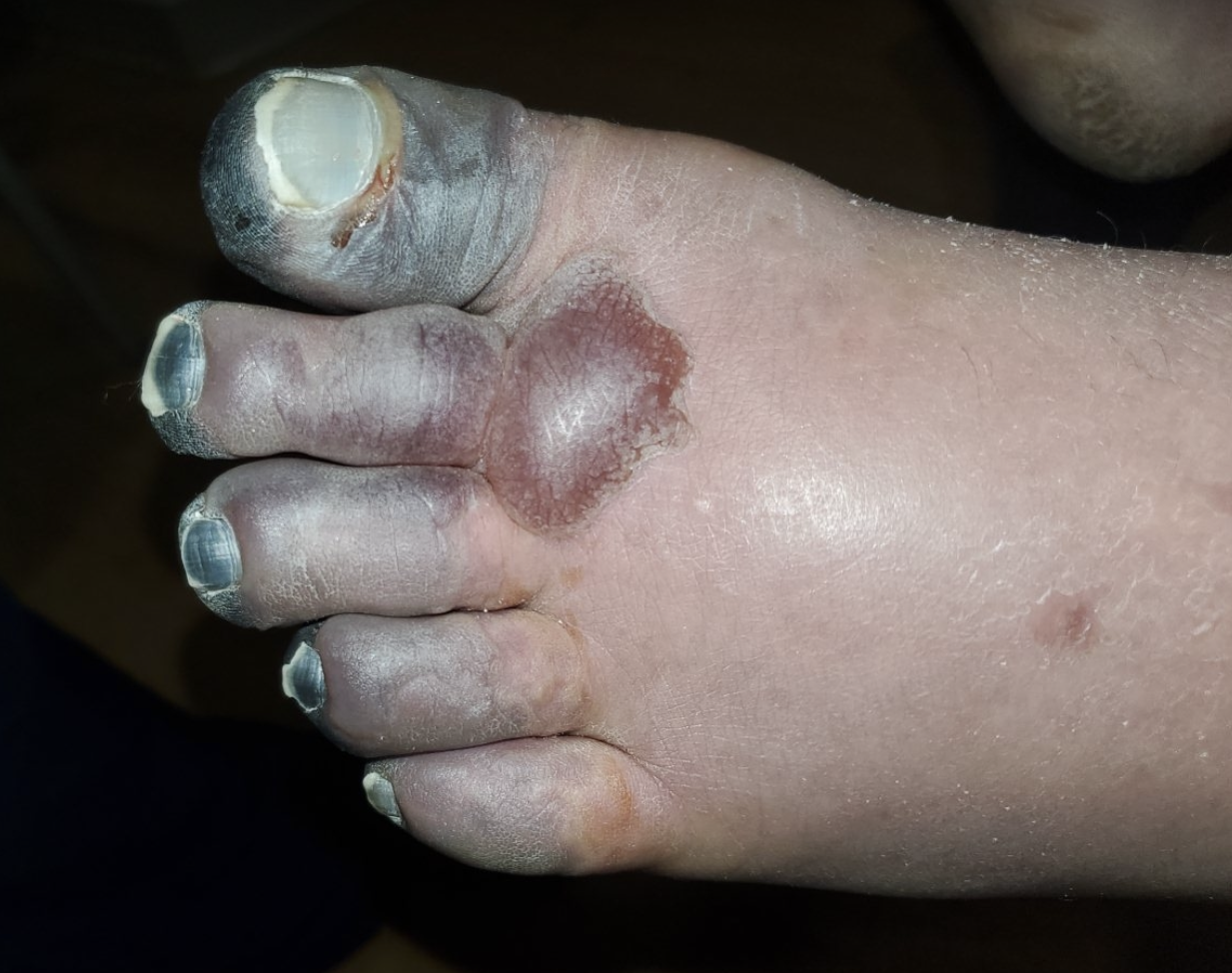
Third-degree frostbite. No surgical interventions recommended as the gangrenous portion of the wound was still demarcating.

=== Third degree ===
- In third-degree frostbite, the layers of tissue below the skin freeze.
- Symptoms include blood blisters and "blue-grey discoloration of the skin".
- In the weeks after injury, pain persists and a blackened crust (eschar) develops.
- There can be long-term ulceration and damage to growth plates.

=== Fourth degree ===
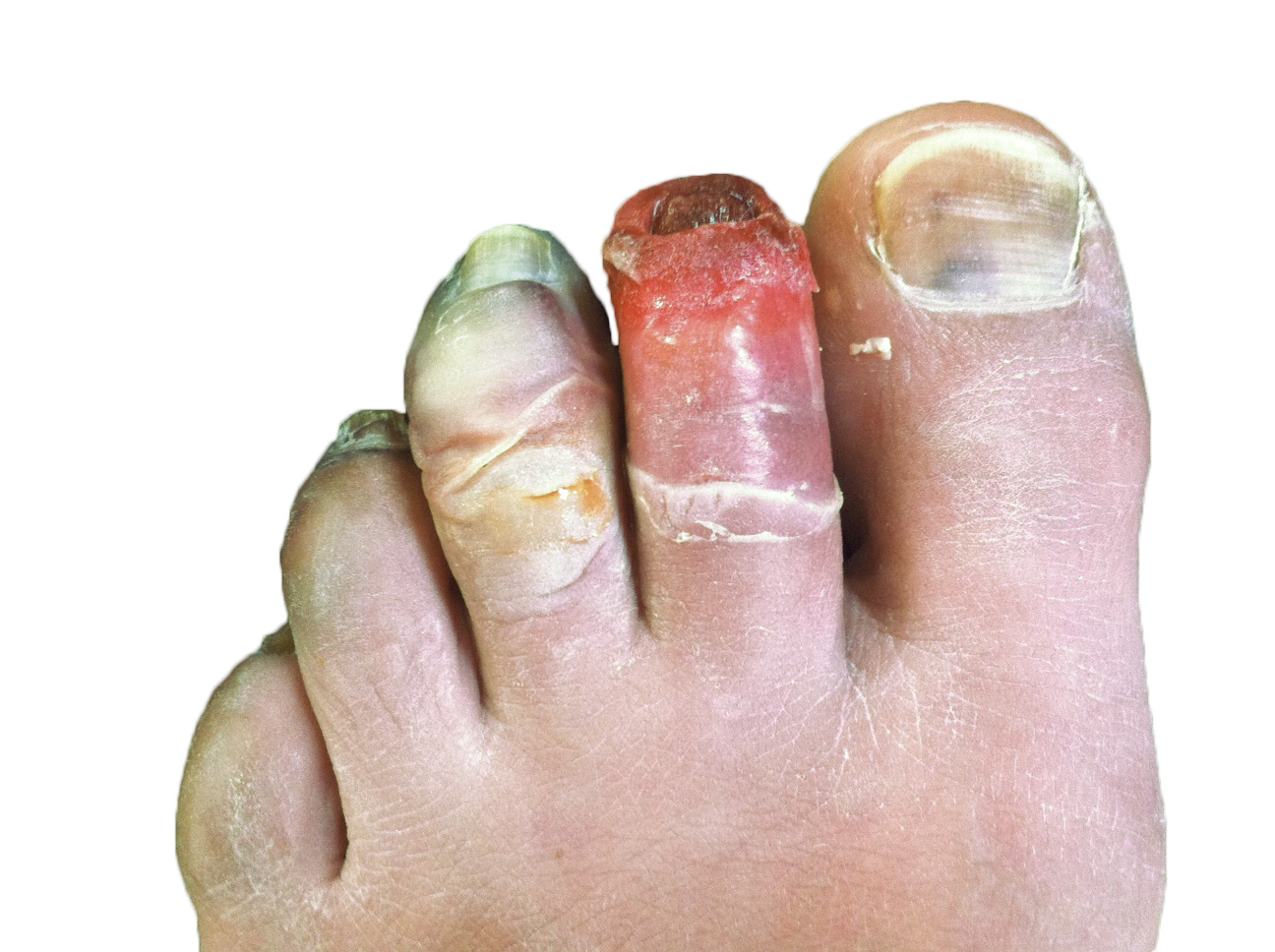
Frostbite 12 days later

- In fourth-degree frostbite, structures below the skin, like muscles, tendon, and bone, are involved.
- Early symptoms include a colorless appearance of the skin, a hard texture, and painless rewarming.
- Later, the skin becomes black and mummified. The amount of permanent damage can take one month or more to determine. Autoamputation can occur after two months.
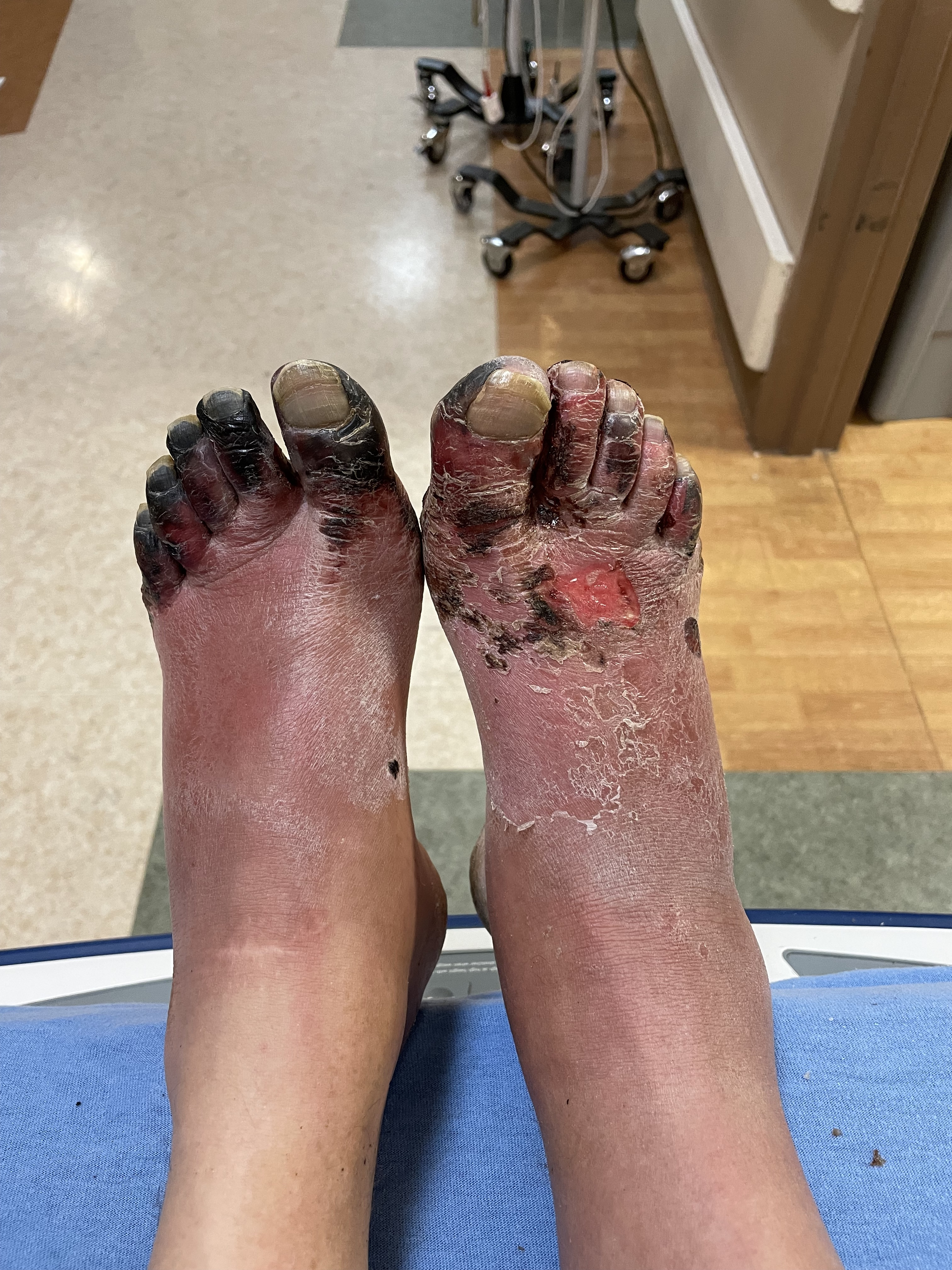
  Fourth-degree frostbite in a homeless patient five days after freezing conditions. Patient developed trench foot and was unable to properly dry feet.
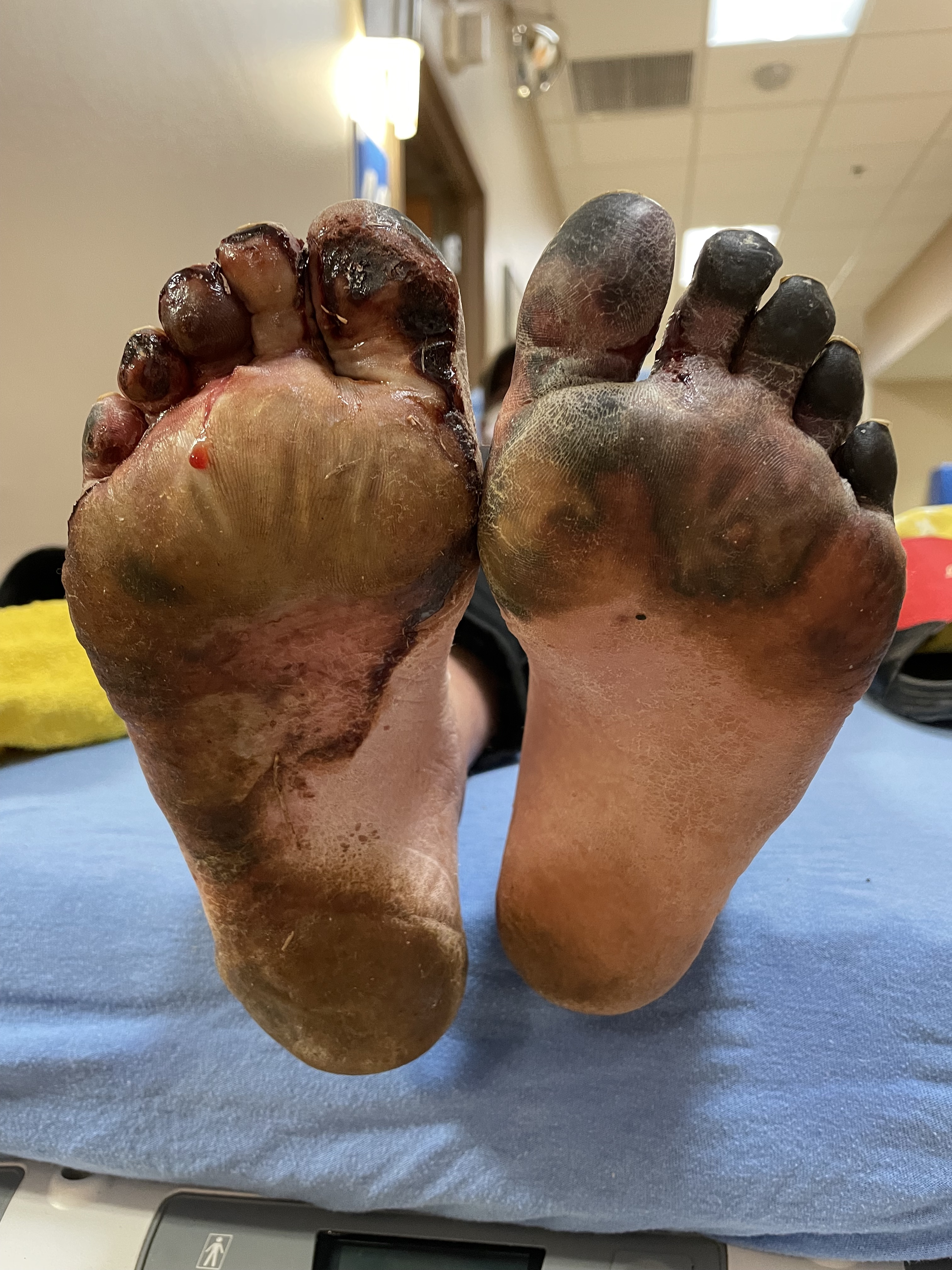
  Plantar surface of frostbitten feet five days after a freeze. Patient was homeless with poor footwear.

== Causes ==
=== Risk factors ===
The major risk factor for frostbite is exposure to cold through geography, occupation and/or recreation. Inadequate clothing and shelter are major risk factors. Frostbite is more likely when the body's ability to produce or retain heat is impaired. Physical, behavioral, and environmental factors can all contribute to the development of frostbite. Immobility and physical stress (such as malnutrition or dehydration) are also risk factors. Disorders and substances that impair circulation contribute, including diabetes, Raynaud's phenomenon, tobacco and alcohol use. Homeless individuals and individuals with some mental illnesses may be at higher risk.

== Mechanism ==
=== Freezing ===
In frostbite, cooling of the body causes narrowing of the blood vessels (vasoconstriction). Prolonged exposure to temperatures below −2 °C (28 °F) may cause ice crystals to form in the tissues, and prolonged exposure to temperatures below −4 °C (25 °F) may cause ice crystals to form in the blood. Ice crystals can damage small blood vessels at the site of injury. Typically, prolonged exposure to temperatures below −0.55 °C (31.01 °F) may cause frostbite.

=== Rewarming ===
Rewarming, though vital, causes tissue damage through reperfusion injury, which involves vasodilation, swelling (edema), and poor blood flow (stasis). Platelet aggregation is another possible mechanism of injury. Blisters and spasm of blood vessels (vasospasm) can develop after rewarming.

=== Non-freezing cold injury ===
The process of frostbite differs from the process of non-freezing cold injury (NFCI). In NFCI, temperature in the tissue decreases gradually. This slower temperature decrease allows the body to try to compensate through alternating cycles of closing and opening blood vessels (vasoconstriction and vasodilation). If this process continues, inflammatory mast cells act in the area. Small clots (microthrombi) form and can cut off blood to the affected area (known as ischemia) and damage nerve fibers. Rewarming causes a series of inflammatory chemicals such as prostaglandins to increase localized clotting.

=== Pathophysiology ===
The pathological mechanism by which frostbite causes body tissue injury can be characterized by four stages: Prefreeze, freeze-thaw, vascular stasis, and the late ischemic stage.

1. Prefreeze phase: involves the cooling of tissues without ice crystal formation.
2. Freeze-thaw phase: ice-crystals form, resulting in cellular damage and death.
3. Vascular stasis phase: marked by blood coagulation or the leaking of blood out of the vessels.
4. Late ischemic phase: characterized by inflammatory events, ischemia and tissue death.

== Diagnosis ==
Frostbite is diagnosed on the basis of signs and symptoms as described above, and by patient history. Other conditions that can have a similar appearance or occur at the same time include:

- Frostnip, a precursor to frostbite with a similar appearance, but without ice crystal formation in the skin. Whitening of the skin and numbness reverse quickly after rewarming.
- Trench foot, damage to nerves and blood vessels that results from exposure to cold wet (non-freezing) conditions. This is reversible if treated early.
- Pernio or chilblains, inflammation of the skin from exposure to wet, cold (non-freezing) conditions. They can appear as various types of ulcers and blisters.
- Bullous pemphigoid, a condition that causes itchy blisters over the body that can mimic frostbite. It does not require exposure to cold to develop.
- Levamisole toxicity, a vasculitis that can appear similar to frostbite. It is caused by contamination of cocaine by levamisole. Skin lesions can look similar to those of frostbite, but do not require cold exposure to occur.

People who have hypothermia often have frostbite as well. Since hypothermia is life-threatening this should be treated first. Technetium-99 or MR scans are not required for diagnosis, but might be useful for prognostic purposes.

== Prevention ==
A Centers for Disease Control and Prevention infographic video about frostbite prevention

The Wilderness Medical Society recommends covering the skin and scalp, taking in adequate nutrition, avoiding constrictive footwear and clothing, and remaining active without causing exhaustion. Supplemental oxygen may also be of use at high elevations. Repeated exposure to cold water makes people more susceptible to frostbite. Additional measures to prevent frostbite include:

- Avoiding temperatures below −23 °C (-9 °F)
- Avoiding moisture, including in the form of sweat and/or skin emollients
- Avoiding alcohol and drugs that impair circulation or natural protective responses
- Layering clothing
- Using chemical or electric warming devices
- Recognizing early signs of frostnip and frostbite

== Treatment ==
Individuals with frostbite or potential frostbite should go to a protected environment and get warm fluids. If there is no risk of re-freezing, the extremity can be exposed and warmed in the underarm of a companion or the groin. If the area is allowed to refreeze, there can be worse tissue damage. If the area cannot be reliably kept warm, the person should be brought to a medical facility without rewarming the area. Rubbing the affected area can also increase tissue damage. Aspirin and ibuprofen can be given in the field to prevent clotting and inflammation. Ibuprofen is often preferred to aspirin because aspirin may block a subset of prostaglandins that are important in injury repair.

The first priority in people with frostbite should be to assess for hypothermia and other life-threatening complications of cold exposure. Before treating frostbite, the core temperature should be raised above 35 °C. Oral or intravenous (IV) fluids should be given.

Other considerations for standard hospital management include:

- wound care: blisters can be drained by needle aspiration, unless they are bloody (hemorrhagic). Aloe vera gel can be applied before breathable, protective dressings or bandages are put on.
- antibiotics: if there is trauma, skin infection (cellulitis) or severe injury
- tetanus toxoid: should be administered according to local guidelines. Uncomplicated frostbite wounds are not known to encourage tetanus.
- pain control: NSAIDs or opioids are recommended during the painful rewarming process.

=== Rewarming ===
If the area is still partially or fully frozen, it should be rewarmed in the hospital with a warm bath with povidone iodine or chlorhexidine antiseptic. Active rewarming seeks to warm the injured tissue as quickly as possible without burning. The faster tissue is thawed, the less tissue damage occurs. According to Handford and colleagues, "The Wilderness Medical Society and State of Alaska Cold Injury Guidelines recommend a temperature of 37–39 °C, which decreases the pain experienced by the patient whilst only slightly slowing rewarming time." Warming takes 15 minutes to 1 hour. The faucet should be left running so the water can circulate. Rewarming can be very painful, so pain management is important.

=== Medications ===
People with potential for large amputations and who present within 24 hours of injury can be given TPA with heparin. These medications should be withheld if there are any contraindications. Bone scans or CT angiography can be done to assess damage.

Blood vessel dilating medications such as iloprost may prevent blood vessel blockage. This treatment might be appropriate in grades 2–4 frostbite, when people get treatment within 48 hours. In addition to vasodilators, sympatholytic drugs can be used to counteract the detrimental peripheral vasoconstriction that occurs during frostbite.

A systematic review and metaanalysis revealed that iloprost alone or iloprost plus recombinant tissue plasminogen activator (rtPA) may decrease amputation rate in case of severe frostbite in comparison to buflomedil alone with no major adverse events reported from iloprost or iloprost plus rtPA in the included studies.

=== Surgery ===
Various types of surgery might be indicated in frostbite injury, depending on the type and extent of damage. Debridement or amputation of necrotic tissue is usually delayed unless there is gangrene or systemic infection (sepsis). This has led to the adage "Frozen in January, amputate in July". If symptoms of compartment syndrome develop, fasciotomy can be done to attempt to preserve blood flow.

== Prognosis ==
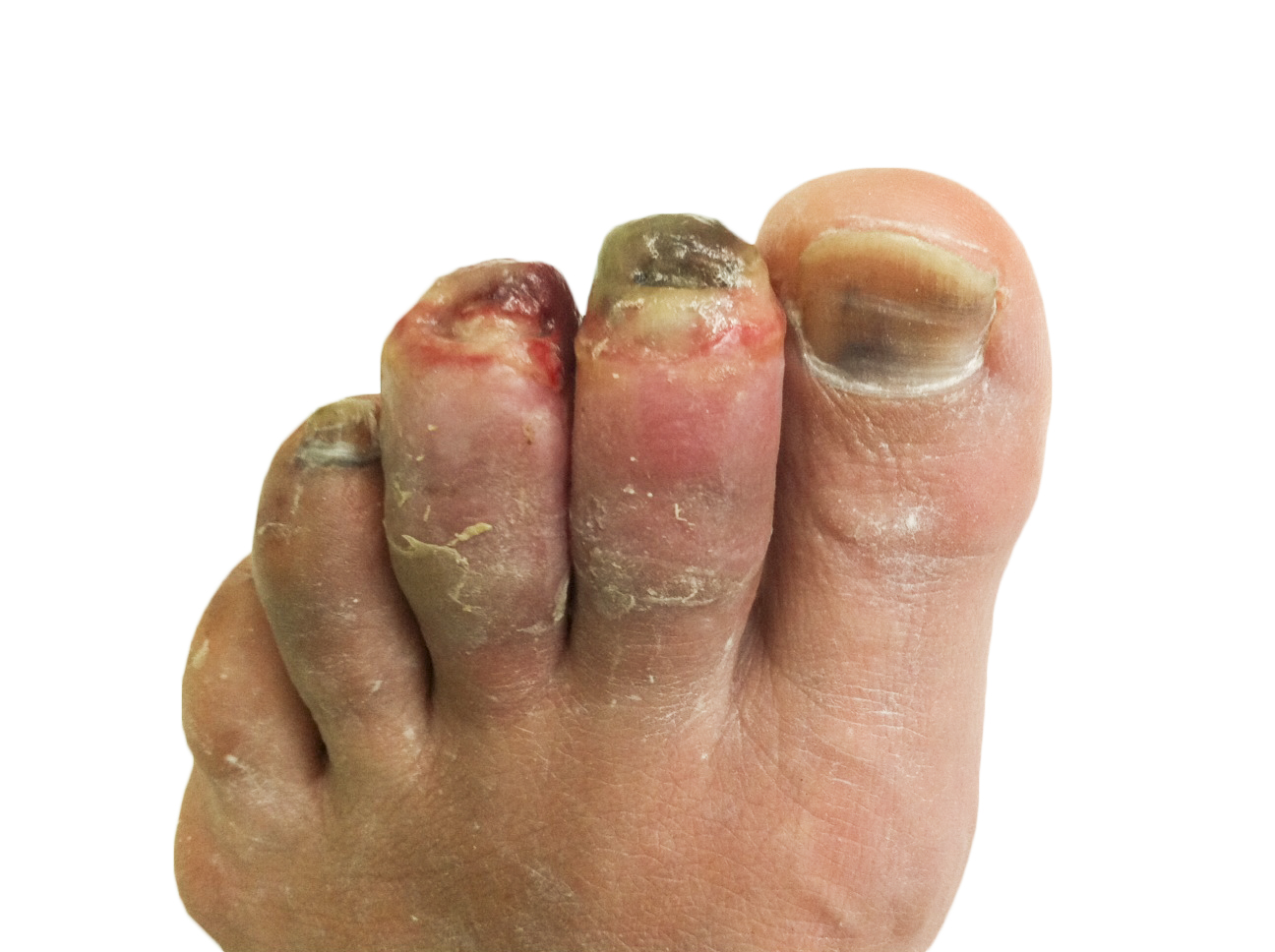
3 weeks after initial frostbite

Tissue loss and autoamputation are potential consequences of frostbite. Permanent nerve damage including loss of feeling can occur. It can take several weeks to know what parts of the tissue will survive. Time of exposure to cold is more predictive of lasting injury than temperature the individual was exposed to. The classification system of grades, based on the tissue response to initial rewarming and other factors is designed to predict degree of longterm recovery.

=== Grades ===
Grade 1: if there is no initial lesion on the area, no amputation or lasting effects are expected

Grade 2: if there is a lesion on the distal body part, tissue and fingernails can be destroyed

Grade 3: if there is a lesion on the intermediate or near body part, auto-amputation and loss of function can occur

Grade 4: if there is a lesion very near the body (such as the carpals of the hand), the limb can be lost. Sepsis and/or other systemic problems are expected.

A number of long term sequelae can occur after frostbite. These include transient or permanent changes in sensation, paresthesia, increased sweating, cancers, and bone destruction/arthritis in the area affected.

== Epidemiology ==
There is a lack of comprehensive statistics about the epidemiology of frostbite. In the United States, frostbite is more common in northern states. In Finland, annual incidence was 2.5 per 100,000 among civilians, compared with 3.2 per 100,000 in Montreal. Research suggests that men aged 30–49 are at highest risk, possibly because of occupational or recreational exposures to cold.

== History ==
Frostbite has been described in military history for millennia. The Greeks encountered and discussed the problem of frostbite as early as 400 BC. Researchers have found evidence of frostbite in humans dating back 5,000 years, in an Andean mummy. Napoleon's Army was the first documented instance of mass cold injury in the early 1800s. According to Zafren, nearly 1 million combatants fell victim to frostbite in the First and Second World Wars and the Korean War.

== Society and culture ==
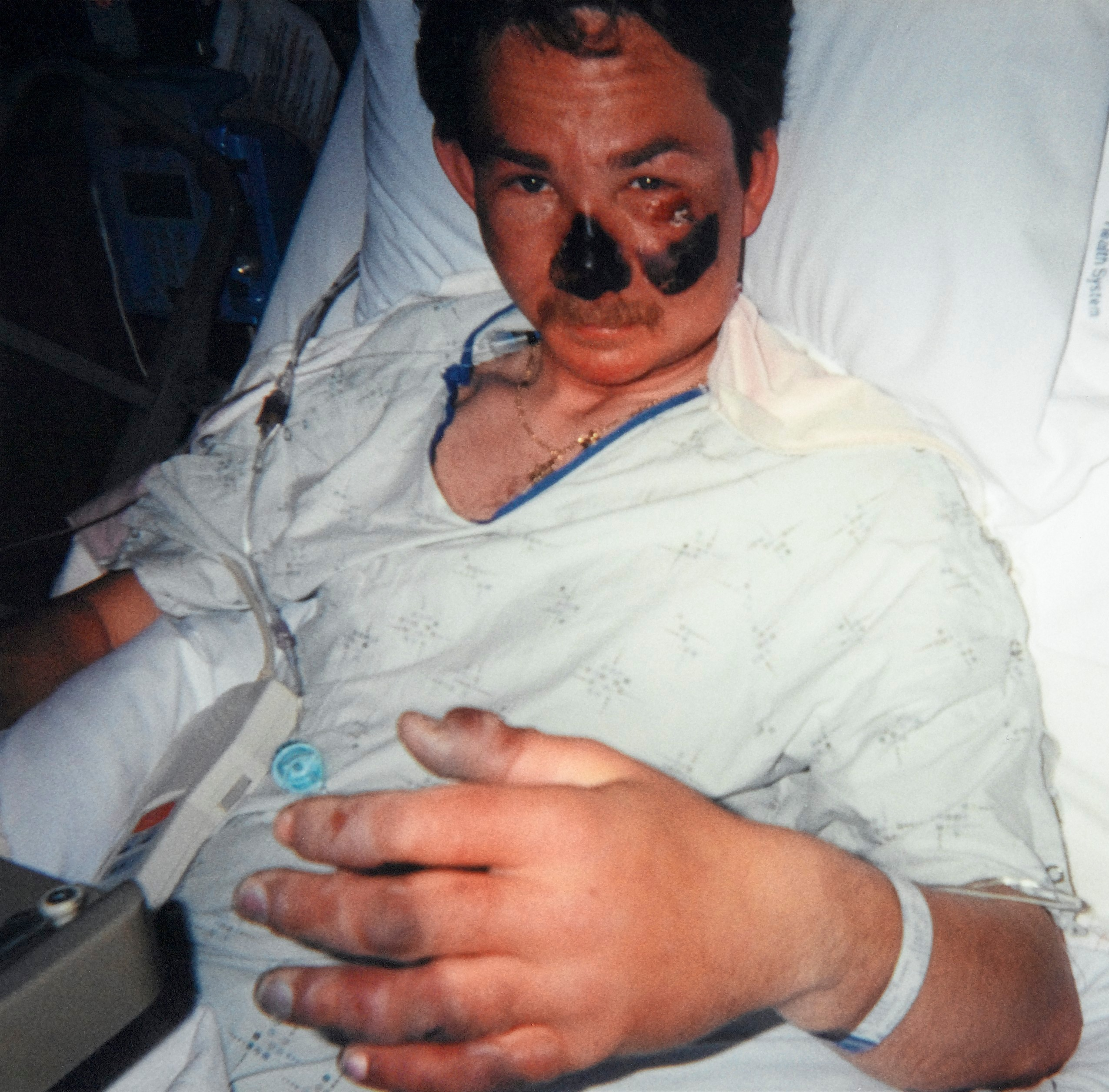
The mountaineer Nigel Vardy in hospital after developing frostbite when benighted on Denali in 1999. His nose, fingers and toes were subsequently amputated.

Several notable cases of frostbite include:

- Captain Lawrence Oates, an English army captain and Antarctic explorer who in 1912 died of complications of frostbite
- Harold Bride, the junior wireless operator of RMS Titanic, who suffered severe frostbite on his feet as he and other survivors stood for over an hour on the back of a capsized lifeboat knee-deep in freezing water—Bride had to be carried off from the rescue vessel RMS Carpathia after it arrived in New York
- The noted American rock climber Hugh Herr, who in 1982 lost both legs below the knee to frostbite after being stranded on Mount Washington (New Hampshire) in a blizzard
- Beck Weathers, a survivor of the 1996 Mount Everest disaster who lost his nose and hands to frostbite
- The Scottish mountaineer Jamie Andrew, who in 1999 had all four limbs amputated as a result of sepsis from frostbite he sustained after becoming trapped for four nights whilst climbing Les Droites in the Mont Blanc massif

== Research directions ==
Evidence is insufficient to determine whether or not hyperbaric oxygen therapy as an adjunctive treatment can assist in tissue salvage. Cases have been reported, but no randomized control trial has been performed on humans.

Medical sympathectomy using intravenous reserpine has also been attempted with limited success. Studies have suggested that administration of tissue plasminogen activator (tPa) either intravenously or intra-arterially may decrease the likelihood of eventual need for amputation.
