= Management of hypertension =

Male high blood pressure

Hypertension is managed using lifestyle modification and antihypertensive medications. Hypertension is usually treated to achieve a blood pressure of below 140/90 mmHg to 160/100 mmHg. According to one 2003 review, reduction of the blood pressure by 5 mmHg can decrease the risk of stroke by 34% and of ischaemic heart disease by 21% and reduce the likelihood of dementia, heart failure, and mortality from cardiovascular disease.

== Blood pressure target ==
Targeting a systolic blood pressure below 120 mmHg compared to 140 mmHg results in a reduced number of cardiovascular events and improves all cause mortality. Naturally, a more aggressive target comes with the cost of more adverse events, but overall there is a clear benefit.

For patients ≥65 years of age, who are more prone to side effects, current guidelines recommend a systolic blood pressure target of 130-139 mmHg if tolerated.

In those with diabetes or kidney disease, some recommend levels below 120/80 mmHg; however, evidence does not support these lower levels.

The benefit of medications is related to a person's cardiac disease risk. Evidence for medications in those with mild hypertension (between 140/90 mmHg and 160/100 mmHg) and no other health problems is less clear, with some reviews finding no benefit and other reviews finding benefit. A 2025 Cochrane review found that medications for mild hypertension did not reduce the risk of death, stroke, or cardiovascular disease, but did cause side effects in 1 of every 12 people. A second review that looked at higher-risk people (mostly diabetics whose blood pressure was difficult to control) found the medication prevented stroke for 1 in 223 and death for 1 in 110 who took it. If there are benefits to treating people with mild hypertension, they appear to occur primarily among those at highest risk, though all groups experience side effects at a similar rate (1 in 12). Medications are not recommended for people with prehypertension or high normal blood pressure.

If the blood pressure goal is not met, a change in treatment should be made as therapeutic inertia is a clear impediment to blood pressure control.

== Lifestyle modifications ==
The first line of treatment for hypertension is identical to the recommended preventive lifestyle changes and includes dietary changes, physical exercise, and weight loss. These have all been shown to significantly reduce blood pressure in people with hypertension. Their potential effectiveness is similar to and at times exceeds a single medication. If hypertension is high enough to justify immediate use of medications, lifestyle changes are still recommended in conjunction with medication.

Dietary change, such as a low sodium diet and a vegetarian diet, are beneficial. A long-term (more than 4-week) low-sodium diet is effective in reducing blood pressure, both in people with hypertension and in people with normal blood pressure. Also, the DASH diet, a diet rich in nuts, whole grains, fish, poultry, fruit and vegetables, lowers blood pressure. A major feature of the plan is limiting intake of sodium, although the diet is also rich in potassium, magnesium, calcium, and protein. A vegetarian diet is associated with a lower blood pressure, and switching to such a diet may be useful for reducing high blood pressure. A review in 2012 found that a diet high in potassium lowers blood pressure in those with high blood pressure and may improve outcomes in those with normal kidney function, while a 2006 review found evidence to be inconsistent; additionally, the review found no significant reduction in blood pressure overall for people with high blood pressure who were given oral potassium supplementation. Meta-analyses conducted by the Cochrane Hypertension group have found no evidence of an appreciable blood pressure reduction from any combination of calcium, magnesium, or potassium supplements; this information stands contrary to prior systematic reviews suggesting that a dietary intake adjustment for each of these may benefit adults with high blood pressure. While weight loss diets reduce body weight and blood pressure, it is unclear if they reduce negative outcomes.

Some programs aimed to reduce psychological stress, such as biofeedback or transcendental meditation, may be reasonable add-ons to other treatment to reduce hypertension. However, several techniques, namely yoga, relaxation, and other forms of meditation, do not appear to reduce blood pressure, and there are major methodological limitations with many studies of stress reduction techniques. There is no clear evidence that the modest reduction in blood pressure with stress reduction techniques results in prevention of cardiovascular disease.

Several exercise regimes—including isometric resistance exercise, aerobic exercise, resistance exercise, and device-guided breathing—may be useful in reducing blood pressure.

== Medications ==
Several classes of medications, collectively referred to as antihypertensive medications, are available for treating hypertension. Use should take into account the person's cardiovascular risk (including risk of myocardial infarction and stroke), as well as blood pressure readings, in order to gain a more accurate picture of the person's risks.

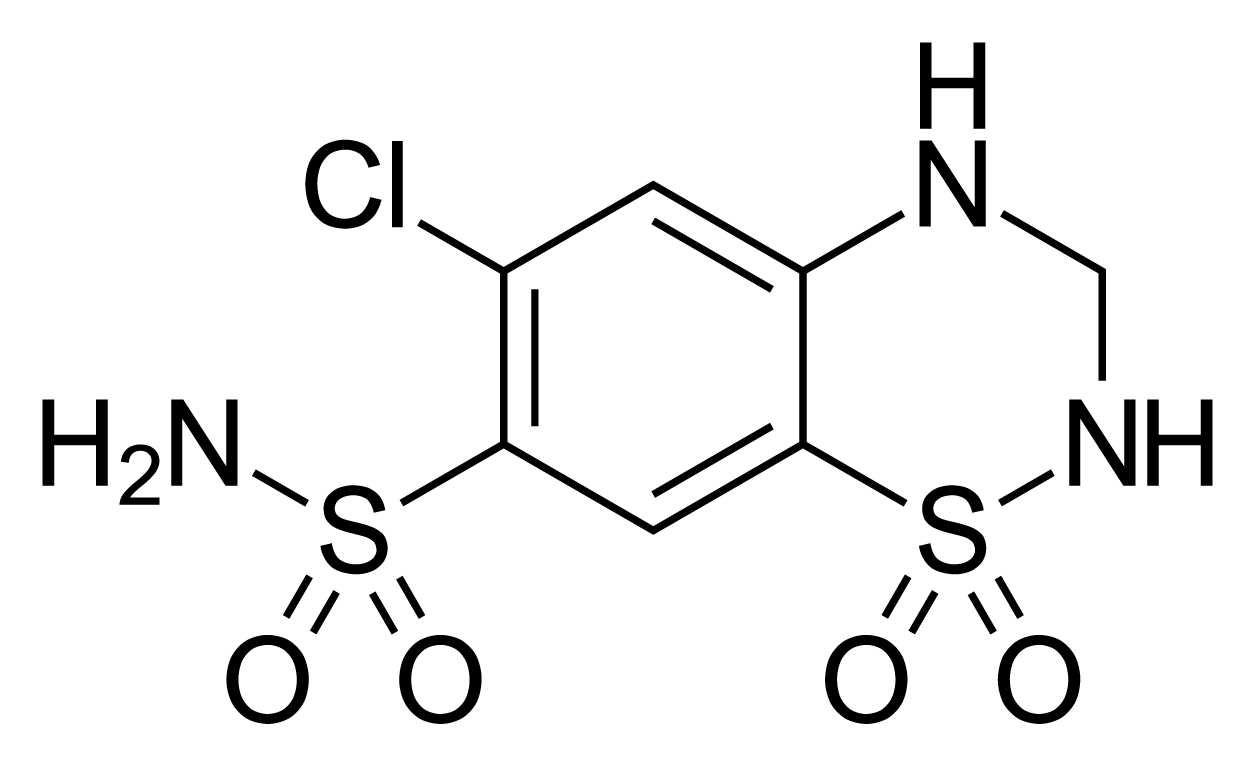
Thiazide diuretic

The best first-line medication is disputed, but the Cochrane collaboration, World Health Organization, and US guidelines support low-dose thiazide-based diuretic as first-line treatment. The UK guidelines emphasise calcium channel blockers (CCB) in preference for people over the age of 55 years or people of African or Caribbean descent, with angiotensin-converting enzyme inhibitors (ACE-I) used as a first line for younger people. In Japan, starting with any one of six classes of medications, including CCB, ACEI/ARB, thiazide diuretics, beta-blockers, and alpha-blockers, is deemed reasonable, while in Canada and Europe all of these except alpha-blockers are recommended as options. Compared to placebo, beta-blockers have a greater benefit in stroke reduction, but no difference on coronary heart disease or all-cause mortality. However, three-quarters of active beta-blocker treatments in the randomised controlled trials included in the review used atenolol, and none used the newer vasodilating beta-blockers.

=== Medication combinations ===
The majority of people require more than one medication to control their hypertension. In those with a systolic blood pressure greater than 160 mmHg or a diastolic blood pressure greater than 100 mmHg, the American Heart Association recommends starting both a thiazide and an ACEI, ARB, or CCB. An ACEI and CCB combination can be used as well. In general, medications should be implemented in a stepped care approach when people do not reach target blood pressure levels.

Unacceptable combinations are non-dihydropyridine calcium blockers (such as verapamil or diltiazem) and beta-blockers, dual renin–angiotensin system blockade (e.g., angiotensin converting enzyme inhibitor + angiotensin receptor blocker), renin–angiotensin system blockers and beta-blockers, and beta-blockers and centrally acting medications. Combinations of an ACE-inhibitor or angiotensin II–receptor antagonist, a diuretic, and an NSAID (including selective COX-2 inhibitors and non-prescribed medications such as ibuprofen) should be avoided whenever possible due to a high documented risk of acute kidney failure. The combination is known colloquially as a "triple whammy" in the Australian health industry. Tablets containing fixed combinations of two classes of medications are available and, while convenient, may be best reserved for those who have been established on the individual components. Additionally, the use of treatments with vasoactive agents for people with pulmonary hypertension with left-heart disease or hypoxemic lung diseases may cause harm and unnecessary expense.

=== Regular monitoring of blood pressure ===
The regular measurement of blood pressure is critical in the management of hypertension. The American Heart Association recommends home monitoring for people with elevated readings. Readings taken at predetermined regular intervals are considered by healthcare providers in determining whether a treatment is working and in suggesting alternative treatments. A study published in December 2018 by Clinical Cardiology showed that a home-based program involving a Bluetooth-enabled blood pressure monitoring device reduced hypertension in seven weeks. In the study, patients with hypertension (blood pressure above 140/90 mmHg) measured their blood pressure twice a day, the blood pressure device transmitted the readings to an electronic medical record, and that data was used to adjust participants' medication at biweekly intervals.

== Elderly ==
Treating moderate to severe hypertension decreases death rates and cardiovascular morbidity and mortality in people aged 60 and older. The recommended blood pressure goal is advised as <150/90 mmHg, with thiazide diuretic, CCB, ACEI, or ARB being the first-line medication in the United States. In the revised UK guidelines, calcium-channel blockers are advocated as first line, with targets of clinic readings <150/90, or <145/85 on ambulatory or home blood pressure monitoring.

There are no randomized clinical trials addressing the goal blood pressure of hypertensives over 79 years old. A recent review concluded that antihypertensive treatment reduced cardiovascular deaths and disease, but did not significantly reduce total death rates. Two professional organizations have published guidelines for the management of hypertension in persons over 79 years old.

== Resistant hypertension ==
Resistant hypertension is defined as hypertension that remains above goal blood pressure in spite of using, at once, three antihypertensive medications belonging to different drug classes. Guidelines for treating resistant hypertension have been published in the UK and US. It has been proposed that a proportion of resistant hypertension may be the result of chronic high activity of the autonomic nervous system, known as "neurogenic hypertension". Low adherence to treatment is an important cause of resistant hypertension. This low adherence to blood pressure treatment is the result of many patients' generally poor health literacy, costly antihypertensive medications, and inability to accurately follow complex regimens.

Some common secondary causes of resistant hypertension include obstructive sleep apnea, pheochromocytoma, renal artery stenosis, coarctation of the aorta, and primary aldosteronism.

== Research ==
=== Non-drug treatment ===
One avenue of research investigating more effective treatments for severe resistant hypertension has focused on the use of selective radiofrequency ablation. It employs a catheter-based device to cause thermal injury to the sympathetic nerves surrounding the renal arteries, with the aim of reducing renal sympathetic overactivity (so-called "renal denervation") and thereby reduce blood pressure. It has been employed in clinical trials for resistant hypertension. However, a prospective, single-blind, randomized, sham-controlled clinical trial failed to confirm a beneficial effect. Infrequent renal artery dissection, femoral artery pseudoaneurysm, and excessive decreases in blood pressure and heart rate have been reported. A 2014 consensus statement from the Joint UK Societies recommended that radiofrequency ablation not be used to treat resistant hypertension, but supported continuing clinical trials. Patient selection, with attention to measurement of pre- and post-procedure sympathetic nerve activity and norepinephrine levels, may help differentiate responders from non-responders to this procedure.

Although considered an experimental treatment in the United States and the United Kingdom, it is an approved treatment in Europe, Australia, and Asia.

=== Pregnancy ===
Regarding research in hypertension that occurs during pregnancy, it has been recommended that basic research be directed toward increasing understanding of the genetics and pathogenesis of oxidative stress in preeclampsia, and that clinical trials be initiated to assess which interventions are effective in preventing oxidative stress during pregnancy. Regarding the management of essential hypertension in women who become pregnant, the recommendation is that clinical trials be initiated to assess the effectiveness of various medication regimens, and their effect on mother and fetus.

=== 2017 guidelines ===
The American Heart Association and the American College of Cardiology issued guidelines on November 13, 2017, based on the findings of the Systolic Blood Pressure Intervention Trial (SPRINT) a large randomized trial published in November 2015 looking at systolic blood pressure targets of 140 and 120 mmHg among persons with at least 130 mmHg systolic blood pressure, increased cardiovascular risk, and no diabetes. The lower target was associated with a 0.5% annual absolute decrease in cardiovascular episodes and all-cause mortality (relative risk 0.75), but also an increased rate of serious adverse events. The method of blood pressure measurement in SPRINT differed from that used for standard office blood pressure, typically giving a 5–10 mmHg lower estimate of blood pressure, and this may need to be taken into account when setting blood pressure targets.
