= Brown's vasomotor index =

Brown's vasomotor index is a test to assess the degree of vasospasm in peripheral arterial disease. The same test is also used to check if sympathectomy is a possible management option for peripheral arterial disease.

== Procedure ==
The specific nerve of the suspected ischemic limb is anesthetized using local anesthesia. In case of lower limbs, the whole limb could be anesthetized using spinal anesthesia. If the ischemic disease is at the stage of vasospasm, the nerve block relives the sympathetic vasospasm and the temperature of the limb rises after the anesthetic block. The rise in skin temperature of the limb is compared to the rise in mouth temperature for reporting Brown's vasomotor index (BVI). It is mathematically expressed as:

$$BVI =  \frac{R_s - R_m}{R_m}$$

where $R_s$ is the rise in skin temperature and $R_m$ is the rise in mouth temperature.

== Interpretation ==
In a healthy adult, Brown's Vasomotor Index is 1. If Brown's vasomotor index is more than 3.5, sympathectomy may be beneficial for the patient.
