= Wrinkle test =

- Purpose: test of peripheral nerve function

The wrinkle test (attributed as O'Riain's or Leukens' wrinkle test) is a test of peripheral nerve function. The fingers are placed in warm water for approximately 10–40 minutes. If the fingers do not wrinkle, this is a sign of denervation.

== See also ==
- Nerve conduction study
