= Hepatalin =

Hormone produced by the liver

Hepatalin is a hormone produced by the liver after feeding and plays a central role in the partitioning of the storage of nutrient energy by its action on glucose uptake and formation of glycogen in muscle. Hepatalin accounts for the majority of postprandial glucose uptake.

Hepatalin secretion from the liver is regulated by three signals: a hepatic parasympathetic-mediated signal, elevated hepatic glutathione (GSH), and pulses of insulin.

== Discovery ==
The discovery of hepatalin action was published in 1996 by a team led by W. Wayne Lautt from the University of Manitoba in Winnipeg, Manitoba, Canada.

The many roles of the hepatic nerves had been studied for years with Lautt proposing in 1979 that hepatic parasympathetic nerve dysfunction could result in type 2 diabetes.

The action of hepatalin was not seen until 1991 when an experiment was conducted to determine if insulin in the blood perfusing the brain could activate the nerves in the liver. It did not, but the response to an injection of a pulse of insulin either to the brain or systemically, was decreased by hepatic surgical denervation. Further studies showed that denervation of the liver reduced the response to insulin in the hindlimbs but had no effect on the liver.

== Naming and Identification ==
Early publications referred to hepatalin as HISS (hepatic insulin sensitizing substance) based on the observation that the response to the same dose of insulin was doubled after a meal.

However, in March 2023, based on decades of research that showed that hepatalin was acting on different cell types through different regulatory mechanisms, a review of the relevant science renamed HISS as "hepatalin."

== Production ==
For hepatalin to be released from the liver, three simultaneous signals must be present.

Two of these are permissive feeding signals sent to the liver. Permissive means that these signals do not directly activate, but instead facilitate or allow some action. The first signal is a post-meal elevation in hepatic glutathione (GSH) levels (~50%).

The second signal is a hepatic parasympathetic-mediated that releases acetylcholine to act on hepatic muscarinic receptors resulting in activation of nitric oxide synthase and generation of nitric oxide in the liver. Either signal alone is not sufficient to trigger hepatalin release. The third required signal is a pulse of insulin. The combination of these three signals triggers the release of a pulse of hepatalin from the liver.

Because hepatalin only appears during digestion, only in response to the three signals, is always seen in the presence of insulin, and because it is metabolized very quickly, the existence of hepatalin remained unknown for 100 years after insulin.

== Hepatalin Action ==
The human body stores nutrient energy that it gets from meals by partitioning it between fats and glycogen. Hepatalin acts selectively on muscle, heart, and kidneys to store nutrient energy as glycogen. Hepatalin does not act on the liver or fat cells (adipocytes) or intestines. Insulin acts mainly on fat cells and the liver, storing fat in fat depots throughout the body, and glycogen and fat in the liver.

In a healthy state, the majority of glucose uptake is accounted for by hepatalin action in muscle. In response to an intravenous injection of insulin after a meal, hepatalin action accounted for approximately 55% of the glucose uptake (in rats) and 66% (in humans). The partitioning of the nutrient energy storage process in a healthy body is dependent on the ratio of insulin and hepatalin action.

If hepatalin action is decreased, glucose levels after a meal rise higher and for longer, and the pancreas must secrete much more insulin to manage the nutrient processing. Nutrient partitioning shifts from glycogen in muscle to lipids, with elevated blood and organ triglycerides resulting. If hepatalin action is reduced chronically, the metabolic consequences account for the predictable, chronological development of the dysfunctions known to be associated with the metabolic syndrome aka syndrome X.

It has been proposed that hepatalin is the missing link in understanding and managing obesity, prediabetes, and type 2 diabetes.

Hepatalin action decreases with age, is worsened by a sugar supplemented diet. Stress and physical inactivity and alcohol reduce hepatalin secretion. In pregnancy, the role of hepatalin changes throughout the period of gestation. Hepatalin action predominates in the first trimester of gestation when uterine and fetal protein metabolism is required. Insulin action predominates in the third trimester when maternal and fetal fat stores are needed.

Alcohol consumption during pregnancy results in dose-related suppression of hepatalin secretion in the adult offspring.

Hepatalin can be acutely turned off and on by manipulation of the mechanisms (i.e., the three necessary signals) regulating hepatalin secretion.

== Media Coverage ==
Hepatalin's existence and discovery was published in the Winnipeg Free Press and reprinted by the Toronto Star. In the article, journalist Martin Cash writes:

"The existence and relevance of that hormone produced by the liver — Hepatic insulin-sensitizing substance (HISS), which SciMar is re-naming hepatalin — was discovered by Dr. Wayne Lautt, professor emeritus at the University of Manitoba’s department of pharmacology and therapeutics in 1996. Lautt’s lab raised $17.5 million in research grants over the years and in 2009 he and his son Mick founded SciMar to hone the research with the intent of making sure it will have an impact for the close to 500 million people around the world who live with type 2 diabetes or pre-diabetes."

A medical test designed around the science of hepatalin, which was described as a "new test can detect diabetes 10 years earlier than a diagnosis," was reported by Breakfast Television, a Canadian news talk show.
