= Autoamputation =

Spontaneous detachment of an appendage

Autoamputation is the spontaneous detachment (amputation) of an appendage or organ from the body. This is not to be confused with self-amputation, which is performed at will. It is usually due to destruction of the blood vessels feeding an extremity such as the finger tips. Once the vessels are destroyed, the tissue is starved of oxygen and dies, which is often followed by gangrene.

Autoamputation is a feature of ainhum, cryoglobulinemia and thromboangiitis obliterans. In 1881, Thornton made the case of autoamputation. Autoamputation could be the result of severe cases of certain chronic wounds, such as frostbite. These chronic wounds might be due to some vascular and pathogenic conditions like Buerger disease or Raynaud's phenomenon. Also, uncontrolled diabetes can predispose one to autoamputation. However, autoamputation has been described as spontaneous. Autoamputation has often been associated with fingers and toes but other parts of the body can suffer this condition as well. There have been reported cases of ovarian autoamputation in a newborn and also in a mature ovary of adults. Autoamputation has been reported to affect an infant of closely consanguineous parentage. Though autoamputation is often regarded as an acquired ailment, it could also be congenital. Chronic torsion or a delay in the diagnosis of acute adnexal torsion has been attributed as causes of acquired autoamputation.

== Types of autoamputation ==
Autoamputation can be categorized as acute, subacute or chronic. Acute autoamputation is characterized by tumor necrosis. This is accompanied by inadequate supply of blood to the heart and other body parts (ischemia) leading to the degeneration of the cells, a condition known as atrophy. Chronic or subacute autoamputation is evident in the attachment of the tumor to other cells surrounding it. There is a rare possibility of the tumor detaching itself from the pedicle. When this happens, it could be parasitic.

== See also ==
- Autotomy
