= Ainhum =

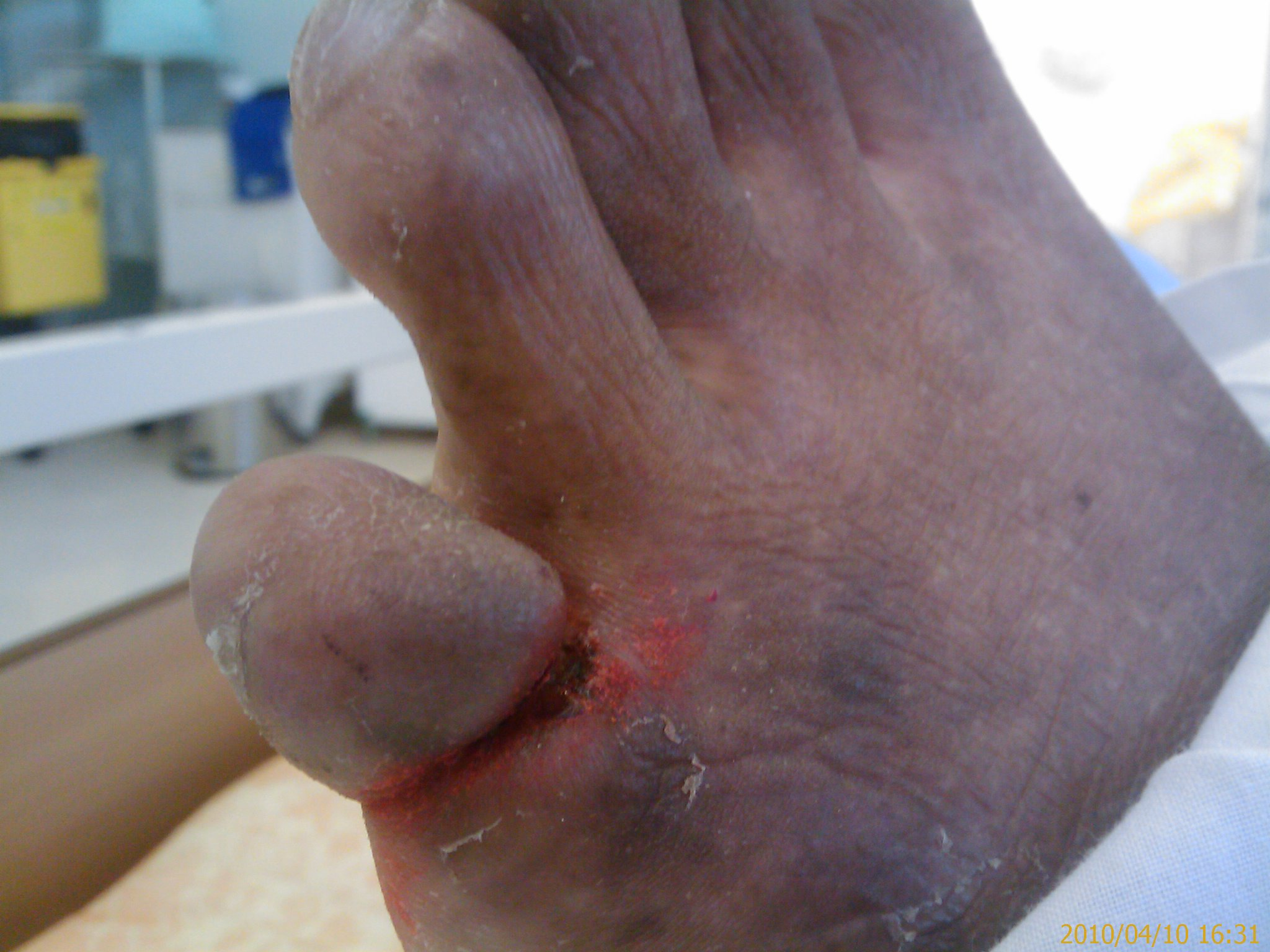
- Ainhum of the left foot of a Zulu patient in Ngwelezane Hospital, KZN, South Africa.(The little toe on the opposite foot had auto-amputated several years earlier
- Specialty: Dermatology

Ainhum (from Portuguese, pronounced [aj.ˈɲũ]), also known as dactylolysis spontanea, is a painful constriction of the base of the fifth toe frequently followed by bilateral spontaneous autoamputation a few years later.

== Signs and symptoms ==
The groove begins on the lower and internal side of the base of the fifth toe, usually according to the plantar-digital fold. The groove becomes gradually deeper and more circular. The rate of spread is variable, and the disease may progress to a full circle in a few months, or still be incomplete after years. In about 75 percent of cases both feet are affected, though not usually to the same degree. There is no case reported where it begins in any other toe than the fifth, while there is occasionally a groove on the fourth or third toe. The distal part of the toe swells and appears like a small potato. The swelling is due to lymphatic edema distal to the constriction. After a time crusts can appear in the groove which can be infected with staphylococcus.

While the groove becomes deeper, compression of tendons, vessels and nerves occurs. Bone is absorbed by pressure, without any evidence of infection. After a certain time all structures distal the stricture are reduced to an avascular cord. The toe’s connection to the foot becomes increasingly slender, and if it is not amputated, it spontaneously drops off without any bleeding. Normally it takes about five years for an autoamputation to occur.

Cole describes four stages of ainhum:

Grade	Pathological progress
I	groove
II	floor of the groove is ulcerated
III	bone involvement
IV	autoamputation has occurred

Pain is present in about 78% of cases. Slight pain is present in the earliest stage of ainhum, caused by pressure on the underlying nerves. Fracture of the phalanx or chronic sepsis is accompanied with severe pain.

== Cause ==
The true cause of ainhum remains unclear. It is not due to infection by parasites, fungi, bacteria or virus, and it is not related to injury. Walking barefoot in childhood had been linked to this disease, but ainhum also occurs in patients who have never gone barefoot. Ethnicity seems to be one of the most predisposing factors and it may have a genetic component, since it has been reported to occur within families. Dent et al. discussed a genetically caused abnormality of the blood supply to the foot. It has been related to inadequate posterior tibial artery circulation and absence of plantar arch.

== Diagnosis ==
=== Histolopathology ===
Histology shows a change in the prickle cell layer, and this is responsible for the laying down of condensed keratin causing the groove. The junctional tissue is reduced to a slender fibrous thread, almost avascular, and all the tissues beyond the constricting band is repressed by a fibro-fatty mass covered by hyperkeratotic integument.

=== Imaging ===
Soft tissue constriction on the medial aspect of the fifth toe is the most frequently presented radiological sign in the early stages. Distal swelling of the toe is considered to be a feature of the disease. In grade III lesions osteolysis is seen in the region of the proximal interphalangeal joint with a characteristic tapering effect. Dispersal of the head of the proximal phalanx is frequently seen. Finally, after autoamputation, the base of the proximal phalanx remains. Radiological examination allows early diagnosis and staging of ainhum. Early diagnosis is crucial to prevent amputation. Doppler shows decreased blood flow in posterior tibial artery.

=== Differential diagnosis ===
Ainhum is an acquired and progressive condition, and thus differs from congenital annular constrictions. Ainhum has been much confused with similar constrictions caused by other diseases such as leprosy, diabetic gangrene, syringomyelia, scleroderma or Vohwinkel syndrome. In this case, it is called pseudo-ainhum, treatable with minor surgery or intralesional corticosteroids, as with ainhum. It has even been seen in psoriasis or it is acquired by the wrapping toes, penis or nipple with hairs, threads or fibers. Oral retinoids, such as tretinoin, and antifibrotic agents like tranilast have been tested for pseudo-ainhum. Impending amputation in Vohwinkel syndrome can sometimes be aborted by therapy with oral etretinate. It is rarely seen in the United States but often discussed in the international medical literature.

== Prevention ==
Wearing shoes to protect barefoot trauma has shown decrease in incidence in ainhum. Congenital pseudoainhum cannot be prevented and can lead to serious birth defects.

== Treatment ==
Incisions across the groove turned out to be ineffective. Excision of the groove followed by z-plasty could relieve pain and prevent autoamputation in Grade I and Grade II lesions. Grade III lesions are treated with disarticulating the metatarsophalangeal joint. This also relieves pain, and all patients have a useful and stable foot. Intralesional injection of corticosteroids is also helpful.

== Epidemiology ==
Ainhum is an extremely rare disease with prevalence reported between 0.015% and 2.2% of the population. Ainhum occurs worldwide, but is most common in people of sub-Saharan African origin. It is more common in men than in women (2:1) between 20 and 50 years of age. The average age is about thirty-eight. The youngest recorded patient was seven years old. Ainhum is often familial.

== History ==
The first description of ainhum in the West appears to have been provided by English surgeon Robert Clarke, who made a passing reference to "dry gangrene of the little toe" as a common occurrence in the Gold Coast in an 1860 report to the Epidemiological Society of London, but did not recognize it as a distinct entity and believed it to be a consequence of "suppressed yaws". Ainhum was first recognized as a distinct disease and described as such in detail by Brazilian physician José Francisco da Silva Lima (1826–1910), in 1867. The name "ainhum" (from the Yoruba ayùn, meaning "to saw" or "to file") was used to refer to the disease by Yoruba speakers in Bahia, Brazil, where Silva Lima practiced.

The first histological studies of ainhum were conducted by O. E. H. Wucherer and published in 1872, and the first imaging studies were conducted in 1924.
