= Renal sympathetic denervation =

- Other names: Renal denervation

Renal sympathetic denervation (RSDN) is a minimally invasive, endovascular catheter based procedure using radiofrequency ablation or ultrasound ablation aimed at treating resistant hypertension (high blood pressure not controlled by medication). Nerves in the wall of the renal artery are ablated by applying radiofrequency pulses or ultrasound to the renal arteries. This causes reduction of sympathetic afferent and efferent activity to the kidney and blood pressure can be decreased. Early data from international clinical trials without sham controls was promising - demonstrating large blood pressure reductions in patients with treatment-resistant hypertension. However, in 2014 a prospective, single-blind, randomized, sham-controlled clinical trial failed to confirm a beneficial effect on blood pressure. A 2014 consensus statement from The Joint UK Societies did not recommend the use of renal denervation for treatment of resistant hypertension on current evidence. More recent sham-controlled trials suggest renal denervation can lead to lower systolic blood pressure.

== History ==
Prior to pharmacological management of hypertension, surgical sympathectomy was a recognized treatment for hypertension. This was often successful in reducing blood pressure but due to its non-selective nature the side effects of the procedure were poorly tolerated. Side effects included orthostatic hypotension, palpitations, anhydrosis, intestinal disturbances, loss of ejaculation, thoracic duct injuries and atelectasis. Modern antihypertensive pharmacological interventions have improved the control of hypertension, but only 34–66% of people with hypertension in England, US and Canada have blood pressure at or below target levels. Resistant hypertension is defined as blood pressure above target (140/90mm Hg) despite concomitant use of three or more anti-hypertensives – one of which should be a diuretic. It has been estimated that 8–10% of people with hypertension fall into this category.

== Devices ==
Several commercial devices exist. These include Medtronic's Symplicity Renal Denervation System, St. Jude Medical's EnligHTN System, Boston Scientific's Vessix V2 Renal Denervation System, Covidien's OneShot System, Recor's Paradise System, Terumo's Iberis System and Cordis Corporation's RENLANE Renal Denervation System.

In August 2023, the US FDA panel recommended the device from ReCor while rejecting the device from Medtronic.

== Procedure ==
The procedure involves endovascular access via the femoral artery with advancement of a catheter-mounted device into the renal artery. The device uses radiofrequency or ultrasound to ablate the renal nerves. Typically, numerous ablations are applied at a different longitudinal and rotational positions to ensure maximal denervation. The procedure does not involve a permanent implant.

== Benefits ==
The most widely discussed studies to date are the Symplicity HTN-1, HTN-2 and HTN-3 trials, conducted with Medtronic's Symplicity RDN System.

Symplicity HTN-1 looked at outcomes in 153 patients that underwent catheter-based renal denervation. Three-year follow-up data have demonstrated an average blood pressure reduction of -33/-19mm Hg.

Symplicity HTN-2 was a randomized, controlled trial that compared 54 control patients with 52 patients who underwent catheter-based renal denervation. Six month follow-up data demonstrated a blood pressure reduction of -32/12 mm Hg in the treated group compared with a change of 1/0 mm Hg in the control group.

Meta-analyses of renal denervation have yielded conflicting results. Whilst office systolic blood pressure reductions typically average around 30 mmHg, reductions observed on ambulatory blood pressure monitoring are typically much smaller, around 10 mmHg. Explanations offered for this mismatch include renal denervation obliterating the white coat response, thereby disproportionately reducing clinic pressures, or inadvertent bias arising from the unblinded design and lack of sham control procedure in almost all renal denervation trial designs to date.

A study published in 2014, Symplicity HTN-3, was a prospective, single-blind, randomised, sham-controlled trial in which 535 patients with severe resistant hypertension were randomized to undergo renal denervation or a sham procedure (in a 2:1 ratio). The results showed no statistically significant difference between renal denervation and the sham procedure.

Following the publication of Symplicity HTN-3 the Joint UK Societies produced a consensus statement that did not recommend the use of renal denervation for treatment of resistant hypertension in routine clinical practice. However they advocated further research with better designed randomised studies.

More recent sham-controlled trials suggest renal denervation can lead to lower systolic blood pressure.

== Risks ==
The Symplicity HTN-1, HTN-2 and HTN-3 trials have demonstrated acceptable safety profiles for catheter based renal denervation. Patients may experience pain during application of radiofrequency pulses and intraprocedural bradycardia requiring atropine has also been reported. Other documented procedure related complications include femoral artery pseudoaneurysm and renal artery dissection.

Of particular concern is the theoretical risk of damage to renal arteries during delivery of radiofrequency energy. An animal study using swine showed no damage to the renal arteries at 6 month follow up. This finding is further supported in human studies in the HTN-1 and HTN-2 trial where follow up imaging has not demonstrated renal vascular damage.

== Other indications ==
Other diseases may be associated with an overactive sympathetic drive and therefore, in theory, renal denervation could be of benefit. Congestive heart failure (CHF), left ventricular hypertrophy (LVH), atrial fibrillation (AF), obstructive sleep apnea (OSA), and insulin resistance/type 2 diabetes mellitus (DM) all have been associated with increased activity of the sympathetic nervous system. Current clinical trials are examining the effect of renal denervation in these conditions.
