= Therapeutic inertia =

Therapeutic inertia (also known as clinical inertia) is a measurement of the resistance to therapeutic treatment for an existing medical condition. It is commonly measured as a percentage of the number of encounters in which a patient with a condition received new or increased therapeutic treatment out of the total number of visits to a health care professional by the patient. A high percentage indicates that the health care provider is slow to treat a medical condition. A low percentage indicates that a provider is extremely quick in prescribing new treatment at the onset of any medical condition.

== Calculation ==
There are two common methods used in calculating therapeutic inertia. For the following examples, consider that a patient has five visits with a health provider. In four of those visits, a condition is not controlled (such as high blood pressure or high cholesterol). In two of those visits, the provider made a change to the patient's treatment for the condition.

In Dr. Okonofua's original paper, this patient's therapeutic inertia is calculated as $\frac{h}{v} - \frac{c}{v}$ where h is the number of visits with an uncontrolled condition, c is the number of visits in which a change was made, and v is the total number of visits. Therefore, the patient's therapeutic inertia is $\frac{4}{5} - \frac{2}{5} = 0.4 = 40\%$.

An alternative, which avoids consideration of visits where the condition was already controlled and the provider should not be expected to make a treatment change, is $1 - \frac{c}{h}$. Using the above example, there are 2 changes and 4 visits with an uncontrolled condition. The therapeutic inertia is $1 - \frac{2}{4} = 0.5 = 50\%$.

== Reception ==
Therapeutic inertia was devised as a metric for measuring treatment of hypertension. It has now become a standard metric for analysing treatment of many common comorbidities such as diabetes and hyperlipidemia. Both feedback reporting processes and intervention studies aimed at reducing therapeutic inertia have been shown to increase control of hypertension, diabetes, and hyperlipidemia.
