= Sympathectomy =

Surgical removal of a sympathetic nervous system ganglion

- ICD-9-CM: 05.2
- MeSH: D015171

A sympathectomy is an irreversible procedure during which at least one sympathetic ganglion is removed. One example is the lumbar sympathectomy, which is advised for occlusive arterial disease in which L2 and L3 ganglia along with intervening sympathetic trunk are removed leaving behind the L1 ganglion which is responsible for ejaculation. Another example is endoscopic thoracic sympathectomy.

== Indications ==
- Hyperhidrosis
- Raynaud syndrome
- Neuropathic pain, although this is controversial
