= List of macroscelids =

Species in mammal order Macroscelidea

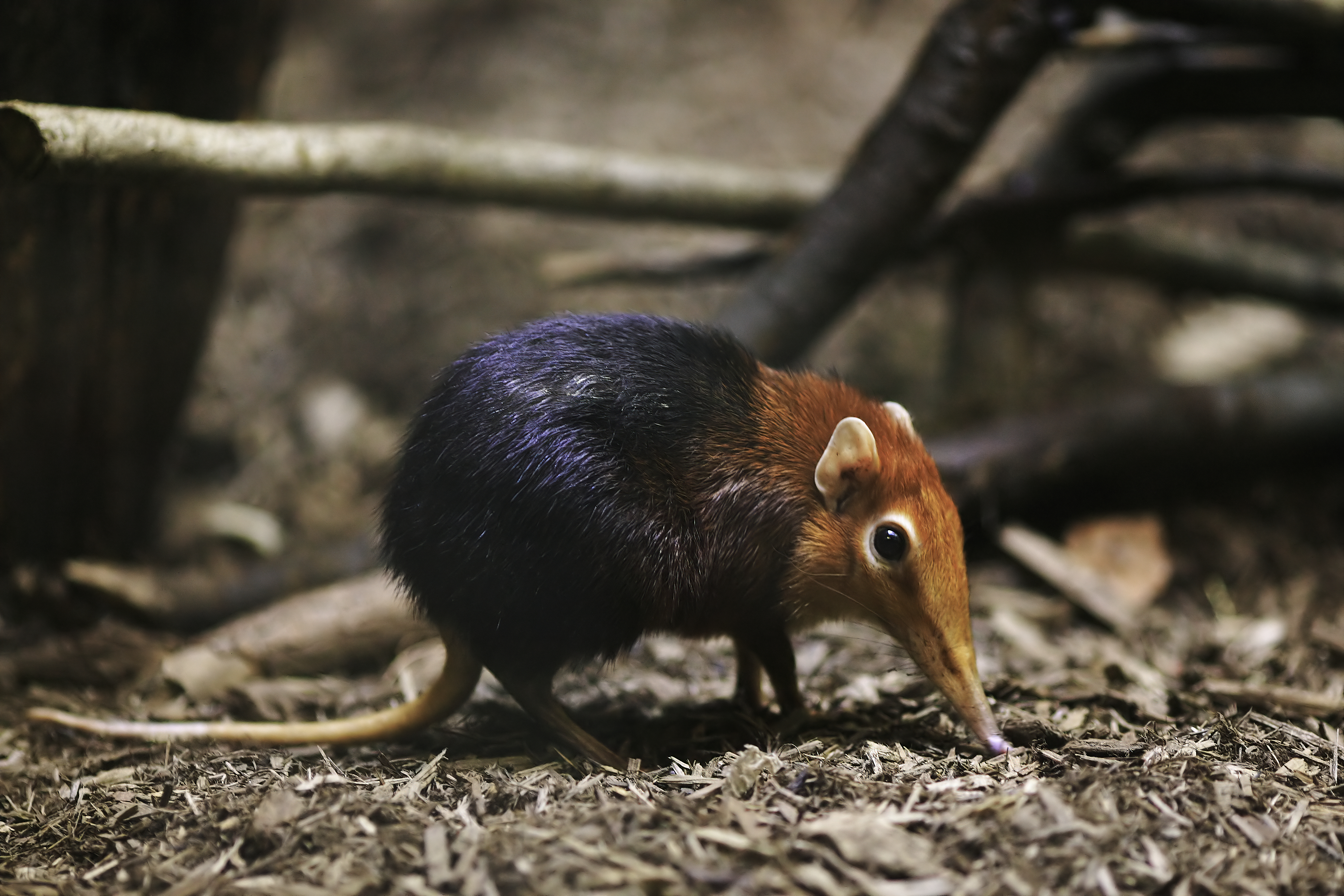
Black and rufous sengi (Rhynchocyon petersi)

Macroscelidea is an order of small mammals. Members of this order are called macroscelids, or commonly as sengis or elephant shrews. They are exclusively found in Africa, in a variety of biomes from forests to deserts. They range in size from the Etendeka round-eared sengi, at 8 cm (3 in) plus a 8 cm (3 in) tail, to the grey-faced sengi, at 32 cm (13 in) plus a 26 cm (10 in) tail, and generally eat insects, other invertebrates, and plants. The only macroscelid species with an International Union for Conservation of Nature (IUCN) population estimate is the golden-rumped sengi, listed as endangered with a population of around 13,000.

The nineteen extant species of Macroscelidea are grouped into a single family, Macroscelididae, and are split between six genera. Dozens of extinct macroscelid species have been discovered, though due to ongoing research and discoveries the exact number and categorization is not fixed.

== Conventions ==
IUCN Red List categories
Conservation status
- EX: Extinct (0 species)
- EW: Extinct in the wild (0 species)
- CR: Critically endangered (0 species)
- EN: Endangered (1 species)
- VU: Vulnerable (1 species)
- NT: Near threatened (0 species)
- LC: Least concern (13 species)

Other categories
- DD: Data deficient (4 species)
- NE: Not evaluated (0 species)

The author citation for the species or genus is given after the scientific name; parentheses around the author citation indicate that this was not the original taxonomic placement. Conservation status codes listed follow the IUCN Red List of Threatened Species. Range maps are provided wherever possible; if a range map is not available, a description of the macroscelid's range is provided. Ranges are based on the IUCN Red List for that species unless otherwise noted. All extinct species or subspecies listed alongside extant species went extinct after 1500 CE, and are indicated by a dagger symbol "†".

== Classification ==
The order Macroscelidea consists of a single family, Macroscelididae, which contains twenty species divided into six genera. Many of these species are further subdivided into subspecies. This does not include hybrid species or extinct prehistoric species.

Family Macroscelididae

- Genus Elephantulus (round-eared sengis): eight species
- Genus Galegeeska (Horn of Africa sengis): two species
- Genus Macroscelides (long-eared sengis): three species
- Genus Petrodromus (four-toed sengi): one species
- Genus Petrosaltator (North African sengi): one species
- Genus Rhynchocyon (checkered sengis): four species

- Macroscelididae
  - Rhynchocyon
  - - - - Galegeeska
        - - Petrosaltator
          - Petrodromus
      - Macroscelides
    - Elephantulus

== Macroscelids ==
The following classification is based on the taxonomy described by Mammal Species of the World (2005), with augmentation by generally accepted proposals made since using molecular phylogenetic analysis.

Genus Elephantulus – Thomas, 1906 – eight species
Common name	Scientific name and subspecies	Range	Size and ecology	IUCN status and estimated population
Bushveld sengi	E. intufi (Smith, 1836)	Southern Africa	Size: 20–28 cm (8–11 in) long, plus 9–15 cm (4–6 in) tail Habitat: Savanna, shrubland, and grassland Diet: Ants, termites, and other small invertebrates, as well as plants	LC Unknown
Cape sengi	E. edwardii (Smith, 1839)	Southern South Africa	Size: 10–13 cm (4–5 in) long, plus 11–15 cm (4–6 in) tail Habitat: Shrubland and rocky areas Diet: Ants and termites, as well as other invertebrates	LC Unknown
Dusky sengi	E. fuscus (Peters, 1852)	Southern Africa	Size: 10–13 cm (4–5 in) long, plus 8–12 cm (3–5 in) tail Habitat: Savanna and shrubland Diet: Believed to be invertebrates	DD Unknown
Dusky-footed sengi	E. fuscipes (Thomas, 1894)	Central Africa	Size: 12–15 cm (5–6 in) long, plus 8–10 cm (3–4 in) tail Habitat: Savanna Diet: Believed to be invertebrates	DD Unknown
Eastern rock sengi	E. myurus Thomas, Schwann, 1906	Southern Africa	Size: 20–29 cm (8–11 in) long, plus 20–29 cm (8–11 in) tail Habitat: Savanna, grassland, and rocky areas Diet: Ants, termites, and other invertebrates, as well as plants	LC Unknown
Karoo rock sengi	E. pilicaudus Smit, Robinson, Watson, van Vuuren, 2008	Western South Africa	Size: 11–12 cm (4–5 in) long, plus 11–15 cm (4–6 in) tail Habitat: Shrubland and rocky areas Diet: Invertebrates	DD Unknown
Short-snouted sengi	E. brachyrhynchus (Smith, 1836)	Southern and southeastern Africa	Size: 11–13 cm (4–5 in) long, plus 8–11 cm (3–4 in) tail Habitat: Savanna and grassland Diet: Ants and termites, as well as small amounts of plants, fruit, and seeds	LC Unknown
Western rock sengi	E. rupestris (Smith, 1831)	Southern Africa	Size: 11–13 cm (4–5 in) long, plus 12–17 cm (5–7 in) tail Habitat: Savanna, shrubland, and rocky areas Diet: Invertebrates	LC Unknown

Genus Galegeeska – Heritage, Rayaleh, 2020 – two species
Common name	Scientific name and subspecies	Range	Size and ecology	IUCN status and estimated population
Somali sengi	G. revoili (Huet, 1881)	Horn of Africa	Size: 12–15 cm (5–6 in) long, plus 12–16 cm (5–6 in) tail Habitat: Savanna and shrubland Diet: Invertebrates as well as plants	DD Unknown
Rufous sengi	G. rufescens (Peters, 1878) Six subspecies: G. r. boranus; G. r. dundasi; G. r. peasei; G. r. pulcher; G. r. rufescens; G. r. somalicus	Eastern Africa	Size: 10–20 cm (4–8 in) long, plus 11–17 cm (4–7 in) tail Habitat: Savanna and grassland Diet: Termites and ants, as well as shoots, berries and roots	LC Unknown

Genus Macroscelides – Smith, 1829 – three species
Common name	Scientific name and subspecies	Range	Size and ecology	IUCN status and estimated population
Etendeka round-eared sengi	M. micus Dumbacher, Rathbun, 2014	Northwestern Namibia	Size: 8–10 cm (3–4 in) long, plus 8–10 cm (3–4 in) tail Habitat: Shrubland, grassland, and desert Diet: Invertebrates	LC Unknown
Namib round-eared sengi	M. flavicaudatus Lundholm, 1955	Namibia	Size: 10–12 cm (4–5 in) long, plus 9–14 cm (4–6 in) tail Habitat: Shrubland and desert Diet: Omnivorous, primarily invertebrates	LC Unknown
Round-eared sengi	M. proboscideus (Shaw, 1800)	Southern Africa	Size: 10–11 cm (4–4 in) long, plus 9–13 cm (4–5 in) tail Habitat: Shrubland and desert Diet: Termites, ants, and other small invertebrates, as well as plants	LC Unknown

Genus Petrodromus – Peters, 1846 – one species
Common name	Scientific name and subspecies	Range	Size and ecology	IUCN status and estimated population
Four-toed sengi	P. tetradactylus Peters, 1846 Nine subspecies: P. t. beirae; P. t. rovumae; P. t. schwanni; P. t. sultani; P. t. swynnertoni; P. t. tetradactylus; P. t. tordayi; P. t. warreni; P. t. zanzibaricus	Central and southeastern Africa	Size: 19–23 cm (7–9 in) long, plus 15–17 cm (6–7 in) tail Habitat: Forest, savanna, and shrubland Diet: Termites, ants, and other small invertebrates, as well as plants	LC Unknown

Genus Petrosaltator – Rathbun, Dumbacher, 2016 – one species
Common name	Scientific name and subspecies	Range	Size and ecology	IUCN status and estimated population
North African sengi	P. rozeti (Duvernoy, 1833) Two subspecies: P. r. deserti; P. r. rozeti	Northwestern Africa	Size: 11–13 cm (4–5 in) long, plus 13–16 cm (5–6 in) tail Habitat: Shrubland, rocky areas, and desert Diet: Believed to be ants, termites, and other invertebrates, as well as plants	LC Unknown

Genus Rhynchocyon – Peters, 1847 – four species
Common name	Scientific name and subspecies	Range	Size and ecology	IUCN status and estimated population
Black and rufous sengi	R. petersi Bocage, 1880 Two subspecies: R. p. adersi; R. p. petersi	Eastern Africa	Size: 25–31 cm (10–12 in) long, plus 25 cm (10 in) tail Habitat: Forest and shrubland Diet: Omnivorous; primarily ants, termites, and other invertebrates	LC Unknown
Checkered sengi	R. cirnei Peters, 1847 Six subspecies: R. c. cirnei; R. c. hendersoni; R. c. macrurus; R. c. reichardi; R. c. shirensis; R. c. stuhlmanni	Central and southeastern Africa	Size: 22–31 cm (9–12 in) long, plus 17–26 cm (7–10 in) tail Habitat: Forest and shrubland Diet: Invertebrates, as well as small mammals, amphibians, mollusks, birds, and bird eggs	LC Unknown
Golden-rumped sengi	R. chrysopygus Günther, 1881	Eastern Kenya	Size: 21–31 cm (8–12 in) long, plus 21–27 cm (8–11 in) tail Habitat: Forest and shrubland Diet: Wide variety of invertebrates	EN 13,000
Grey-faced sengi	R. udzungwensis Rovero, Rathbun, 2008	Central Tanzania	Size: 29–32 cm (11–13 in) long, plus 23–26 cm (9–10 in) tail Habitat: Forest Diet: Unknown	VU Unknown

== Sources ==
- Schlitter, Duane A. (2005). Wilson, Don E.; Reeder, DeeAnn M. (eds.). Mammal Species of the World. Vol. 1 (3rd ed.). Johns Hopkins University Press. ISBN 978-0-8018-8221-0.
- Kingdon, Jonathan; Happold, David; Butynski, Thomas; Hoffmann, Michael; Happold, Meredith; Kalina, Jan, eds. (2013). Mammals of Africa. Vol. 1. Bloomsbury Publishing. ISBN 978-1-4081-8996-2.
