= List of mammalian gestation durations =

This is a collection of lists of mammal gestation period estimated by experts in their fields. The mammals included are only viviparous (marsupials and placentals) as some mammals, which are monotremes (including platypuses and echidnas) lay their eggs. A marsupial has a short gestation period, typically shorter than placental. For more information on how these estimates were ascertained, see Wikipedia's articles on gestational age.

The gestation figures given here are shown in days. They represent average values and should only be considered as approximations.

Mammal	Gestation period (days)			Reference
	Min	Max	Average	
Aardvark (Orycteropus afer)			213	
Anteater (Giant) (Myrmecophaga tridactyla)	170	190	180	
Ape (Bonobo) (Pan paniscus)	196	260	228	
Ape (Bornean orangutan) (Pongo pygmaeus)			234	
Ape (Chimpanzee) (Pan troglodytes)	230	250	240	
Ape (Gorilla) (Genus Gorilla)	255	260	257	
Ape (Human) (Homo sapiens)	259	275	270	
Ape (Lar gibbon) (Hylobates lar)			220	
Ape (Siamang) (Symphalangus syndactylus)			236	
Armadillo (Nine-banded) (Dasypus novemcinctus)			120	
Armadillo (Six-banded) (Euphractus sexcinctus)			62	
Badger (American) (Taxidea taxus)			60	
Bat (Common vampire) (Desmodus rotundus)			213	
Bat (Little brown) (Myotis lucifugus)	50	60	55	
Bear (Black) (Ursus americanus)			220	
Bear (Giant panda) (Ailuropoda melanoleuca)	95	160	127	
Bear (Grizzly) (Ursus arctos)			215	
Bear (Polar) (Ursus maritimus)			241	
Bovid (American bison) (Bison bison)			285	
Bovid (Barbary sheep) (Ammotragus lervia)			158	
Bovid (Bay duiker) (Cephalophus dorsalis)			120	
Bovid (Bighorn sheep) (Ovis canadensis)			180	
Bovid (Blackbuck) (Antilope cervicapra)			165	
Bovid (Cattle) (Bos taurus)	279	287	283	
Bovid (Common eland) (Taurotragus oryx)			255	
Bovid (Domestic goat) (Capra hircus)	145	155	150	
Bovid (Domestic sheep) (Ovis aries)			150	
Bovid (Domestic yak) (Bos grunniens)			255	
Bovid (Dorcas gazelle) (Gazella dorcas)			132	
Bovid (Impala) (Aepyceros melampus)			191	
Bovid (Mountain goat) (Oreamnos americanus)			176	
Bovid (Sable antelope) (Hippotragus niger)			270	
Bovid (Thomson's gazelle) (Gazella thomsonii)			165	
Bovid (Zebu) (Bos indicus)			280	
Camelid (Alpaca) (Lama pacos)			345	
Camelid (Bactrian camel) (Camelus bactrianus)	360	420	390	
Camelid (Llama) (Lama glama)			330	
Canid (African wild dog) (Lycaon pictus)			71	
Canid (Bat-eared fox) (Otocyon megalotis)			65	
Canid (Coyote) (Canis latrans)			62	
Canid (Domestic dog) (Canis familiaris)	58	65	61	
Canid (Golden jackal) (Canis aureus)			62	
Canid (Island fox) (Urocyon littoralis)			63	
Canid (Red fox) (Vulpes vulpes)			52	
Canid (Wolf) (Canis lupus)	60	68	64	
Cat (Canadian lynx) (Lynx canadensis)			60	
Cat (Cheetah) (Acinoyx jubatus)			92	
Cat (Domestic) (Felis catus)	58	67	64	
Cat (Leopard) (Panthera pardus)	92	95	93	
Cat (Lion) (Panthera leo)			108	
Cat (Puma) (Puma concolor)			90	
Cat (Tiger) (Panthera tigris)	105	113	109	
Deer (Chital) (Axis axis)			218	
Deer (Common fallow) (Dama dama)			228	
Deer (Elk, aka Wapiti) (Cervus canadensis)	240	250	245	
Deer (Moose) (Alces alces)	240	250	245	
Deer (Mule) (Odocoileus hemionus)			206	
Deer (Père David's) (Elaphurus davidianus)			284	
Deer (Red) (Cervus elaphus)			238	
Deer (Reindeer) (Rangifer tarandus)			215	
Deer (Sambar) (Rusa unicolor)			246	
Deer (White-tailed) (Odocoileus virginianus)			201	
Elephant shrew (Bushveld) (Elephantulus intufi)			51	
Elephant shrew (Eastern rock) (Elephantulus myurus)			46	
Elephant (African bush) (Loxodonta africana)			670	
Elephant (African forest) (Loxodonta cyclotis)			670	
Elephant (Asian) (Elephas maximus)	548	670	609	
Equid (Burchell's_zebra) (Equus quagga burchelli)			390	
Equid (Donkey) (Equus asinus)	335	426	365	
Equid (Grant's zebra) (Equus quagga boehmi)	361	390	375	
Equid (Horse) (Equus caballus)	330	342	336	
Ferret (Domestic) (Mustela furo)	41	42	41	
Galago (Family Galagidae)			124	
Giraffe (Genus Giraffa)	420	450	430	
Hare (European) (Lepus europaeus)			41	
Hedgehog (European) (Erinaceus europaeus)			34	
Hippopotamus (Common) (Hippopotamus amphibius)	225	250	237	
Hyena (Striped) (Hyaena hyaena)			90	
Hyrax (Rock) (Procavia capensis)			255	
Kinkajou (Potos flavus)			77	
Lemur (Superfamily Lemuroidea)			128	
Manatee (West Indian) (Trichechus manatus)	365	426	396	
Marsupial (Kangaroo) (Family Macropodidae)			42	
Marsupial (Koala) (Phascolarctos cinereus)			34	
Marsupial (Quokka) (Setonix brachyurus)			26	
Marsupial (Stripe-faced dunnart) (Sminthopsis macroura)	9.5	12	11	
Marsupial (Virginia opossum) (Didelphis virginiana)	12	13	12	
Marsupial (Wombat) (Family Vombatidae)	26	28	27	
Mink (European) (Mustela lutreola)	38	76	57	
Monkey (Baboon) (Genus Papio)			185	
Monkey (Blue) (Cercopithecus mitis)			140	
Monkey (Bonnet macaque) (Macaca radiata)	153	169	161	
Monkey (Brown woolly) (Lagothrix lagothrica)			139	
Monkey (Celebes crested macaque) (Macaca nigra)	155	175	164	
Monkey (Crab-eating macaque) (Macaca fascicularis)	153	179	165	
Monkey (Dusky leaf) (Trachypithecus obscurus or Presbytis obscurus)			150	
Monkey (Formosan rock macaque) (Macaca cyclopis)			163	
Monkey (Gelada) (Theropithecus gelada)			170	
Monkey (Goeldi's marmoset) (Callimico goeldii)	149	152	151	
Monkey (Golden lion tamarin) (Leontopithecus rosalia)			131	
Monkey (Gracile capuchin) (Genus Cebus)			180	
Monkey (Grey-cheeked mangabey) (Cercocebus albigena)			174	
Monkey (Grivet) (Cercopithecus aethiops)			210	
Monkey (Guenon) (Genus Cercopithecus)			160	
Monkey (Japanese macaque) (Macaca fuscata)	150	180	166	
Monkey (King colobus) (Colobus polykomos)	180	213	202	
Monkey (Mantled howler) (Alquatta paliatta)			139	
Monkey (Northern plains gray langur) (Semnopithecus entellus or Presbytis entellus)			183	
Monkey (Patas) (Erythrocebus patas)			192	
Monkey (Proboscis) (Nasalis larvatus)			166	
Monkey (Red-shanked douc) (Pygathrix nemaeus)	180	190	185	
Monkey (Red-tailed) (Cercopithecus ascanius)			190	
Monkey (Rhesus macaque) (Macaca mulatta)			164	
Monkey (Southern pig-tailed macaque) (Macaca nemestrina)	168	171	170	
Monkey (Spider) (Genus Ateles)			139	
Monkey (Squirrel) (Genus Saimiri)			167	
Monkey (Stump-tailed macaque) (Macaca arctoides)	168	184	182	
Monkey (Talapoin) (Cercopithecus talapoin)			196	
Monkey (Tamarin) (Genus Saguinus)			162	
Monkey (Toque macaque) (Macaca sinica)			180	
Monkey (Vervet) (Cercopithecus pygerythrus)			195	
Otter (Subfamily Lutrinae)	60	86	73	
Pig (Domestic) (Sus domesticus)	112	115	113	
Pig (Wild boar) (Sus scrofa)			120	
Pinniped (California sea lion) (Zalophus californianus)			350	
Pinniped (Northern fur seal) (Callorhinus ursinus)			254	
Pinniped (Southern elephant seal) (Mirounga leonina)			335	
Pinniped (Walrus) (Odobenus rosmarus)			456	
Pinniped (Weddel seal) (Leptonychotes wedelli)			310	
Pronghorn (Antilocapra americana)			246	
Rabbit (Domestic) (Oryctolagus cuniculus domesticus)	28	35	31	
Raccoon (Common) (Procyon lotor)			63	
Rhinoceros (Black) (Diceros bicornis)			450	
Rhinoceros (Indian) (Rhinoceros unicornis)			478	
Rhinoceros (White) (Ceratotherium simum)			467	
Rodent (Beaver) (Genus Castor)			122	
Rodent (Chinchilla) (Genus Chinchilla)	105	115	110	
Rodent (Chinese hamster) (Cricetulus griseus)			21	
Rodent (Chipmunk) (Subtribe Tamiina)			31	
Rodent (Cotton mouse) (Peromyscus gossypinus)			23	
Rodent (Coypu) (Myocastor coypus)			132	
Rodent (Crested porcupine) (Hystrix cristata)			112	
Rodent (Domestic guinea pig) (Cavia porcellus)	56	74	65	
Rodent (Domestic mouse) (Mus musculus)			19	
Rodent (Eastern gray squirrel) (Sciurus carolinensis)	30	40	35	
Rodent (Golden hamster) (Mesocricetus auratus)			16	
Rodent (Greater Egyptian gerbil) (Gebrillus pyramidum)			21	
Rodent (Green acouchi) (Myoprocta pratti)			98	
Rodent (Hamster) (Subfamily Cricetinae)	16	23	20	
Rodent (Hispid cotton rat) (Sigmodon hispidus)			27	
Rodent (Meadow mouse) (Microtus pennsylvanicus)			21	
Rodent (Mongolian gerbil) (Meriones unguiculatus)	22	130	24	
Rodent (Muskrat) (Ondatra zibethicus)	28	30	29	
Rodent (North American porcupine) (Erethizon dorsatum)			113	
Rodent (Rat) (Genus Rattus)	21	23	22	
Rodent (Red squirrel) (Sciurus vulgaris)			38	
Rodent (Southern flying squirrel) (Glaucomys volans)			40	
Rodent (White-footed mouse) (Peromyscus leucopus)			23	
Skunk (Striped) (Mephitis mephitis)			65	
Sloth (Hoffmann's two-toed)) (Choloepus hoffmanni)	355	377	366	
Sloth (Pale-throated) (Bradypus tridactylus)			183	
Slow loris (Sunda) (Nycticebus coucang)			90	
Tapir (Malayan) (Acrocodia indica)			379	
Treeshrew (Common) (Tupaia glis)			46	
Whale (Beluga) (Delphinapterus leucas)			408	
Whale (Blue) (Balaenoptera musculus)	305	365	335	
Whale (Bottlenose dolphin) (Tursiops truncatus)			364	
Whale (Harbour porpoise) (Phocoena phocoena)			270	
Whale (Northern right whale dolphin) (Lissodelphis borealis)	368	374	371	
Whale (Orca) (Orcinus orca)	473	567	532	
Whale (Sperm) (Physeter catodon)	480	590	535	
Whale (Spinner dolphin) (Stenella longirostris)			318	

== Factors affecting the gestation period in mammals ==
There are several factors affecting the length of the gestation period in mammals.

=== Animal size/mass ===
There is a positive relationship between mass at birth and length of gestation in eutherian mammals. Larger mammals are more likely to produce a well-developed neonate than small mammals. Large mammals develop at an absolute slower rate compared to small mammals. Thus, the large mammal tend have longer gestation periods than small mammal as they tend to produce larger neonate. Large mammals require a longer period of time to attain any proportion of adult mass compared to small mammals.

=== The level of development at birth ===
More developed infants will typically require a longer gestation period. Altricial mammals needs less time to gestate compare to the precocial (well-developed neonate) mammal. A typical precocial mammal has a gestation period almost four times longer than a typical altricial mammal of the same body size. Precocial mammal species generally have greater adult body weights than altricial mammals as precocial mammals have markedly longer gestation periods than altricial mammals. The neonatal of larger mammals develop relatively more quickly and thus making it more likely that a large mammal would produce a more well-developed neonate as a consequence of its longer gestation period. In some cases, some mammal species may have similar gestation periods despite having significantly different body masses.

=== Environmental factor ===
In response to the conditions of the environment, some mammals, such as bat delay the implantation due to the cold temperature in winter. Another factor is due to the shortage of food stocks during winter as the insects are being driven away and as the result, bat hibernate in pregnant condition.

In pinnipeds, the purpose of delayed implantation is in order to increase survival chance of the young animals as the mother ensure that the neonates are born at an optimal season.

== See also ==
- Evolution of mammals - Timing of placental evolution
- Gestation
