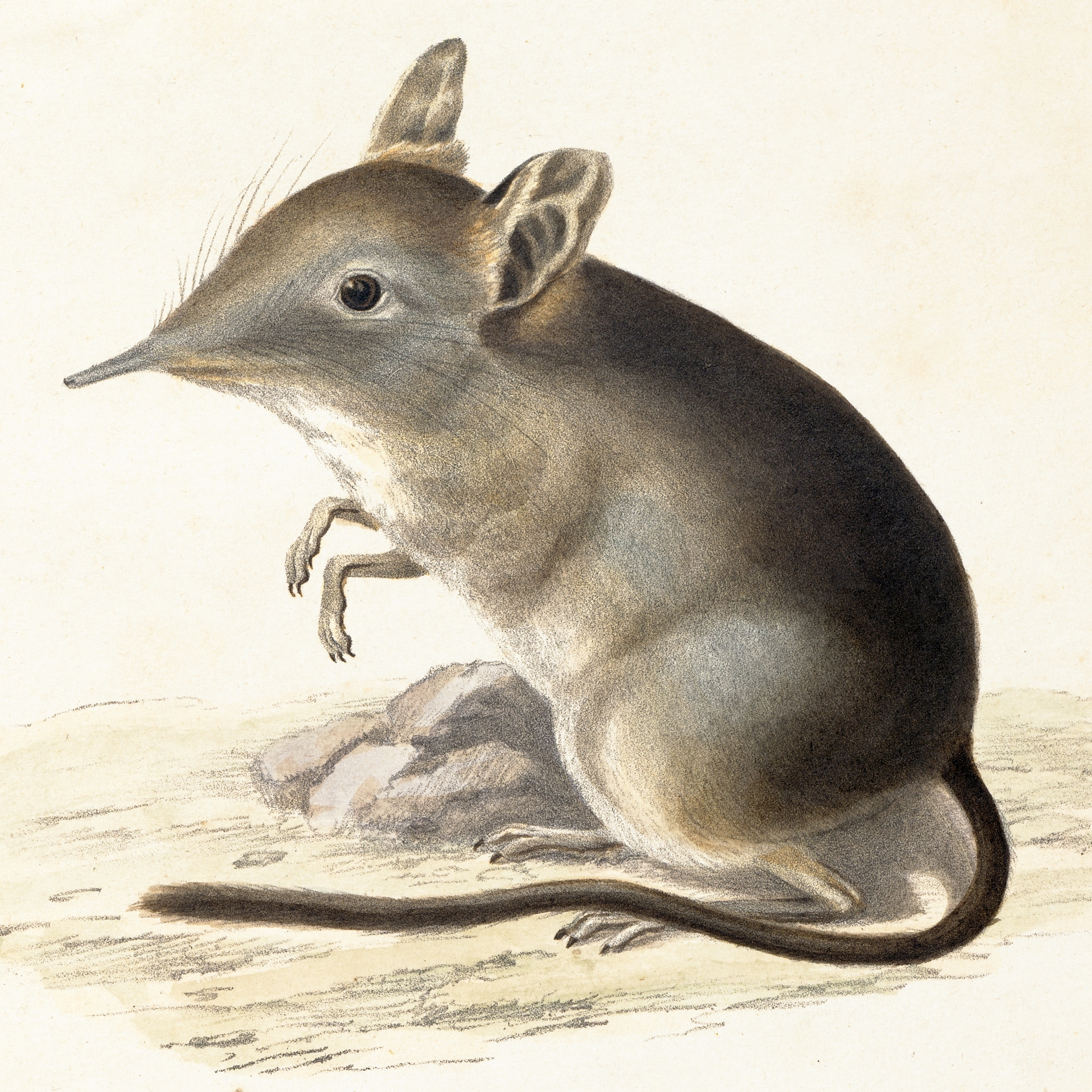

Conservation status
- Least Concern (IUCN 3.1)

Scientific classification
- Kingdom: Animalia
- Phylum: Chordata
- Class: Mammalia
- Infraclass: Placentalia
- Order: Macroscelidea
- Family: Macroscelididae
- Genus: Elephantulus
- Species: E. edwardii

Binomial name
- Elephantulus edwardii (A. Smith, 1839)
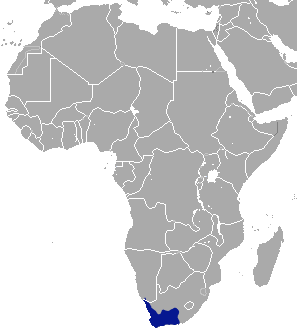
- Cape sengi range

Synonyms
- Elephantulus capensis Roberts, 1924; Elephantulus edwardsii (Sclater, 1901); Elephantulus karoensis Roberts, 1938

= Cape rock sengi =

Cape sengi

Species of mammal

The Cape sengi or Cape elephant shrew (Elephantulus edwardii), also known as the Cape rock sengi or Cape rock elephant shrew or Cape rock sengi, is a species of small mammal in the sengi family (Macroscelididae). It is endemic to South Africa, although it is a relatively common animal. Its natural habitat is rocky areas. Despite often being called elephant shrews, the sengis are not closely related to true shrews, nor to rodents such as mice. E. edwardii has been observed to be a non-flying mammal pollinator of the pagoda lily (Massonia bifolia). Sengis are floral pollinators due to their largely insectivorous diet. Elephant-shrews are pollinators of Hyobanche atropurpurea. It uses its long slender tongue to feed on the pagoda lily's nectar while getting the lily's pollen on its long nose. E. edwardii is also a pollinator of Protea sulphurea.
