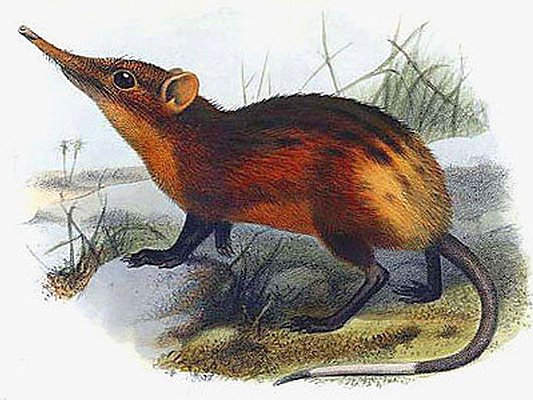

Conservation status
- Endangered (IUCN 3.1)

Scientific classification
- Kingdom: Animalia
- Phylum: Chordata
- Class: Mammalia
- Order: Macroscelidea
- Family: Macroscelididae
- Genus: Rhynchocyon
- Species: R. chrysopygus

Binomial name
- Rhynchocyon chrysopygus Günther, 1881
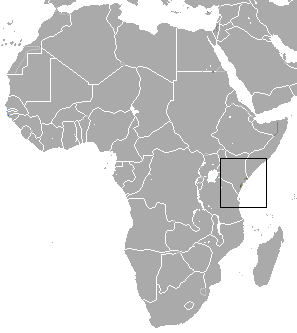
- Range

= Golden-rumped sengi =

Species of mammal

The golden-rumped sengi or golden rumped elephant shrew (Rhynchocyon chrysopygus) is a small African mammal. It is the largest species of the sengi family (Macroscelididae) along with its close relative the grey-faced sengi. It is classified as endangered.

== Taxonomy and description ==
The golden-rumped sengi is found in the northern coastal areas in and around Arabuko Sokoke National Park Mombasa in Kenya. Its name derives from the conspicuous golden fur on its hindquarters, distinctive golden coloration on its rump, and grizzled gold forehead contrasting with its dark reddish-brown color. The golden-rumped sengi has long muscular rear legs and shorter, less developed forelegs. Like other sengis, this species has the distinctive long and flexible snout that led to them being given the name elephant shrews. Its tail is largely black except for the last third, which is white with a black tip. On juveniles, the fur shows vestigial traces of a checkerboard pattern seen on giant sengis like the checkered sengi.

== Reproduction ==
The golden-rumped sengi are monogamous and territorial behavior is seen in both males and females defending overlapping territories. They mate year round. Females give birth to one young in an approximate 42-day cycle. The newborn offspring are usually ready to leave the mother's den after two weeks, and it takes approximately five days after leaving the nest for them to become fully independent in the wild. The male does not take part in any parental care of the newborns.

== Habitat and distribution ==
The golden-rumped sengi is a diurnal animal, which lives in densely vegetated forests, avoiding clear and open areas to help protect themselves from predators. Golden-rumped sengis build up to six nests at a time, alternating nests every night to leave no pattern for hunting predators to follow. It inhabits coastal regions and is found in moist, dense-brush forests and lowland semi-deciduous forests. Males have slightly larger home areas than females, and are more likely to trespass into neighboring territories, which makes them more vulnerable to predators.

== Ecology and behavior ==
Their diet consists of invertebrates such as earthworms, millipedes, insects and spiders. These animals root through the leaf litter for 80% of their day looking for grasshoppers, beetles, spiders and other small invertebrates. The golden-rumped sengi evolved various strategies to avoid predators, particularly snakes (such as black mambas and cobras) and the southern banded snake-eagle. This animal is fast, capable of running up to 25 km/h (16 mph). When it detects a predator within its escape distance, it will adopt a defensive position and will try to escape taking advantage of its agility and speed. If, however, the predator is outside its escape distance, the sengis will advertise its presence by slapping the leaf litter, letting the predator know it has been spotted. In the event of a chase or an ambush, the golden-rumped's flash of fur will often deflect the predator's attention away from the head and onto the rump, which has thicker skin and could give them an opportunity to survive an attack. The protected rump is more pronounced in males than female, and this dermal shield is roughly three times thicker than the skin in the middle of its back. Each shrew maintains several nests so they cannot be easily found by leaving a trace or establishing a pattern.

== Threats and conservation ==
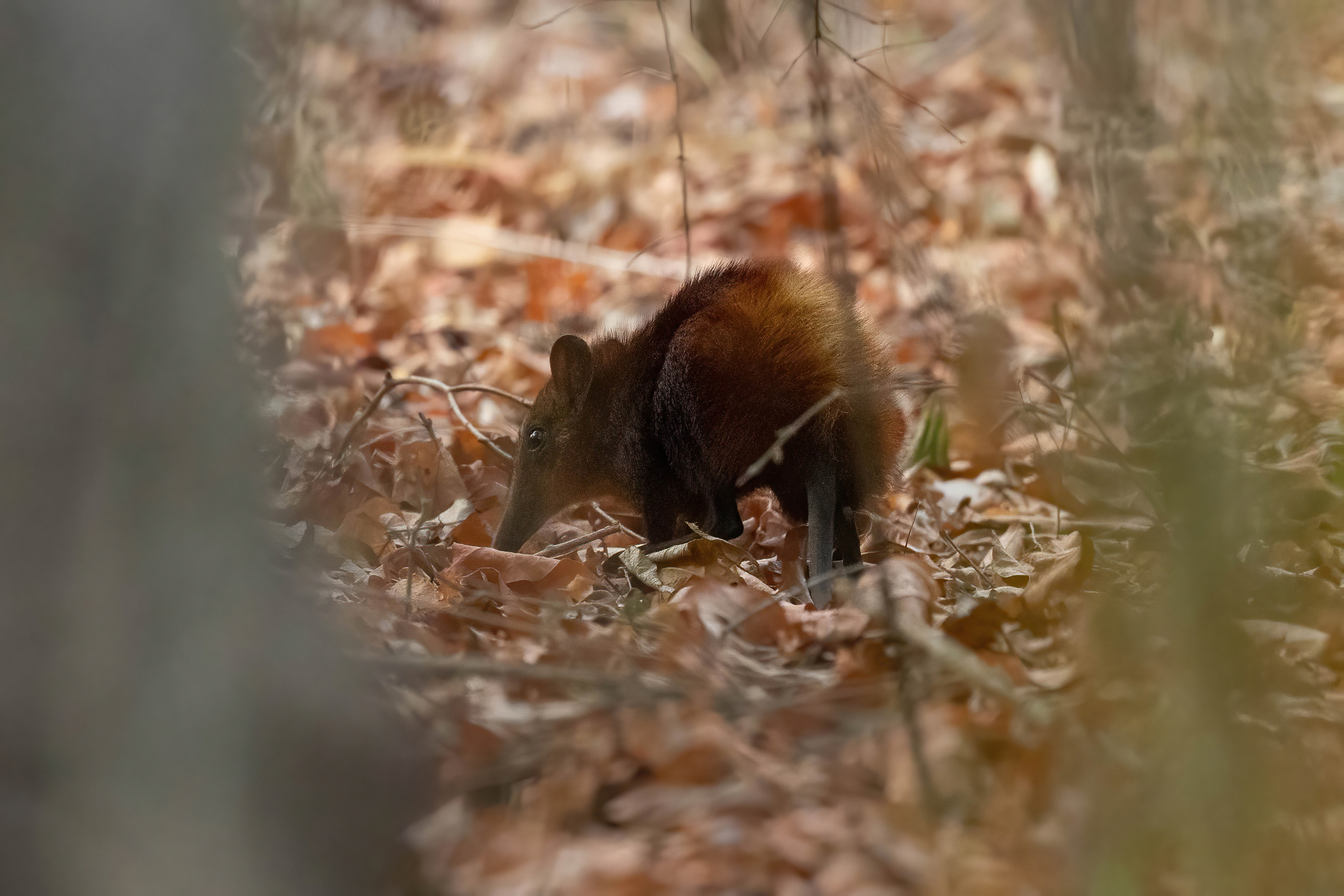
Golden-rumped sengi photographed through the grass.

The golden-rumped sengi is classified as endangered largely due to a fragmented forest environment and anthropogenic factors. Their most notable population is in the Arabuko-Sokoke Forest in Kenya. They are subject to being caught in traps, but are not targeted as a source of food because of their poor taste. In the early 1990s, it was estimated that roughly 3,000 were caught yearly by trappers. Forest patrols have reduced trapping since then, but there are areas that are not patrolled, where trappers are able to trap freely. The Arabuko-Sokoke forest and other Kenyan forests where the shrews live, have the status of National Monuments, which prevents any further development, but does not particularly provide specific protection for them or for biodiversity. Due to their small populations, even though many are protected, their numbers are expected to continue to decline due to stochastic events and further anthropogenic disturbances.
