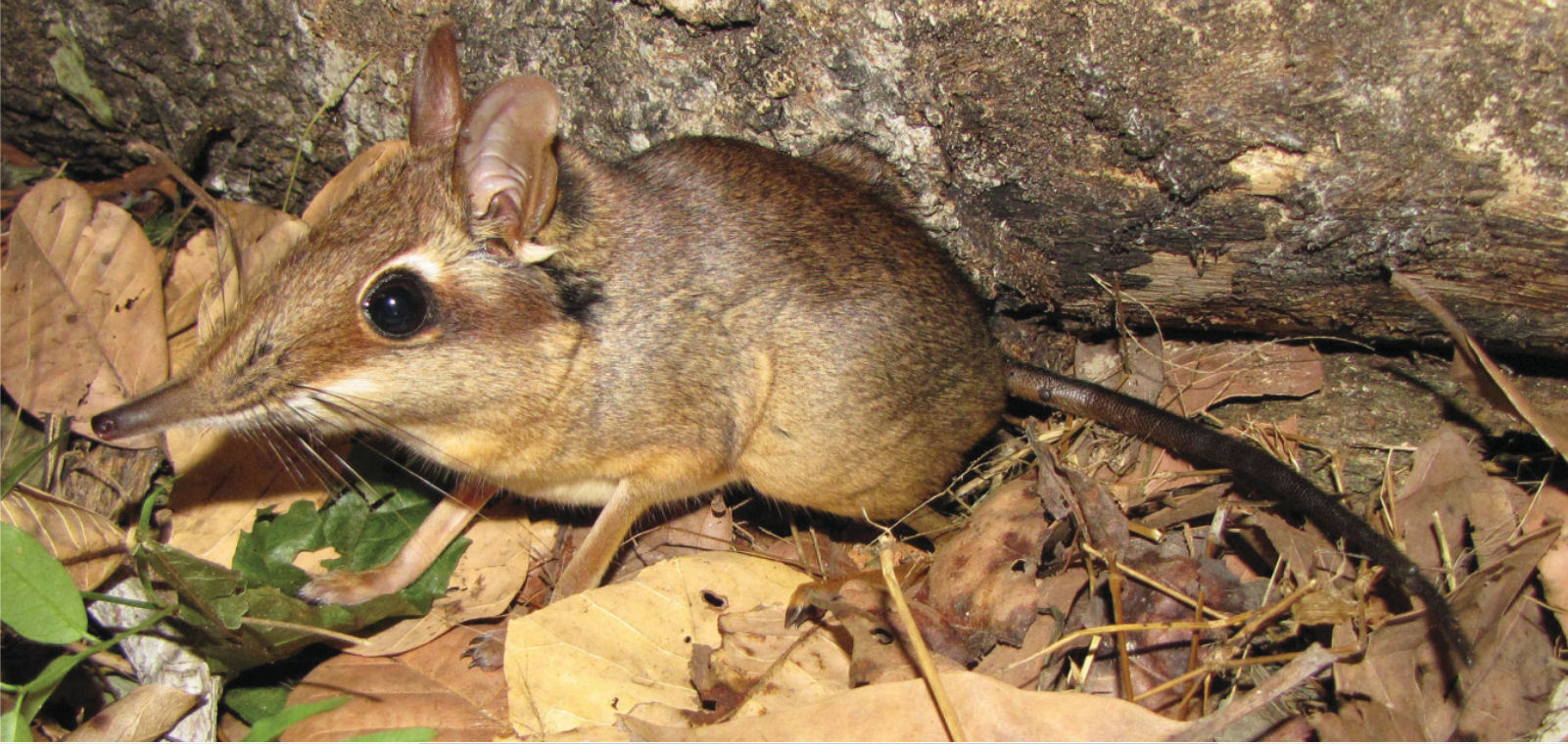

Conservation status
- Least Concern (IUCN 3.1)

Scientific classification
- Kingdom: Animalia
- Phylum: Chordata
- Class: Mammalia
- Order: Macroscelidea
- Family: Macroscelididae
- Genus: Petrodromus; Peters, 1846
- Species: P. tetradactylus

Binomial name
- Petrodromus tetradactylus Peters, 1846
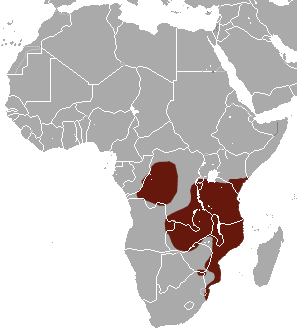
- Four-toed sengi range

= Four-toed sengi =

Species of mammal

The four-toed sengi or four-toed elephant shrew (Petrodromus tetradactylus) is the only living species in the genus Petrodromus, which together with five other extant genera Rhynchocyon, Macroscelides, Petrosaltator, Galegeeska and Elephantulus constitutes the order Macroscelidea. This species of sengi is only found in particular regions in Africa and is smaller than its relatives. A comprehensive record of this species is lacking.

As its name suggests, the species has four toes on its hind feet, and like other sengis, it has been named for its elephant-like, mobile proboscis.

== Geographic location and habitat ==
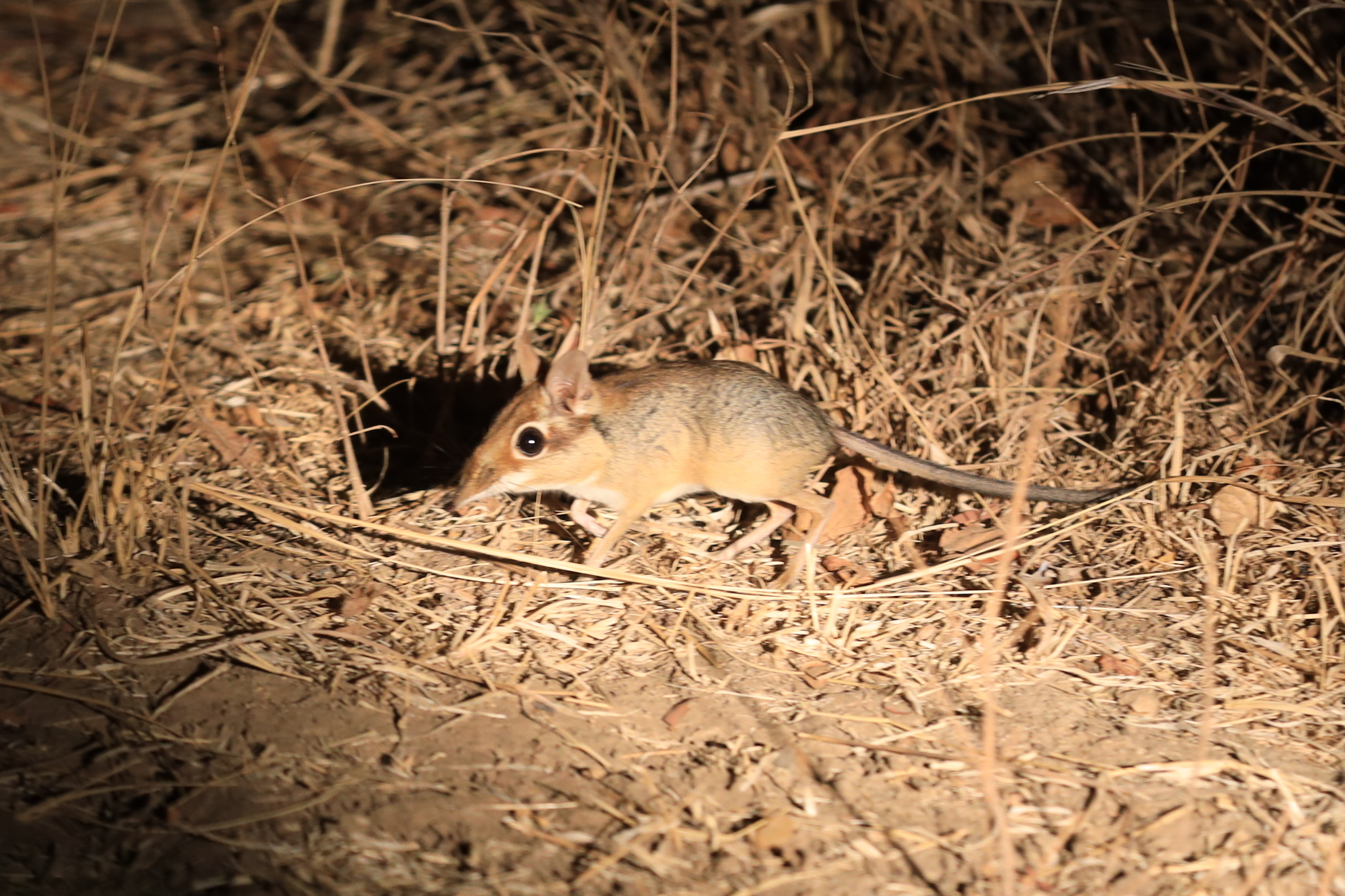
In Zambia

The four-toed sengi is found in Central and Southern East Africa, notably in Angola, Democratic Republic of the Congo, Kenya, Malawi, Mozambique, South Africa, Tanzania, Zambia, Zimbabwe, and possibly Namibia. Its natural habitats are subtropical or tropical dry forests, montane forests, and moist savannas. Throughout these countries, they are the second most widespread species, following the short-snouted sengi.

Specifically, they thrive in dense forests (notably in dense evergreen growths), woodlands and thickets, with suitable cover and protection, as well as invertebrates for food. During the night, they prefer to sleep under dense brush (as opposed to a nest).

In some areas, their habitats are being destroyed and four-toed sengis are being hunted, but their conservation status is of least concern.

== Physical characteristics ==
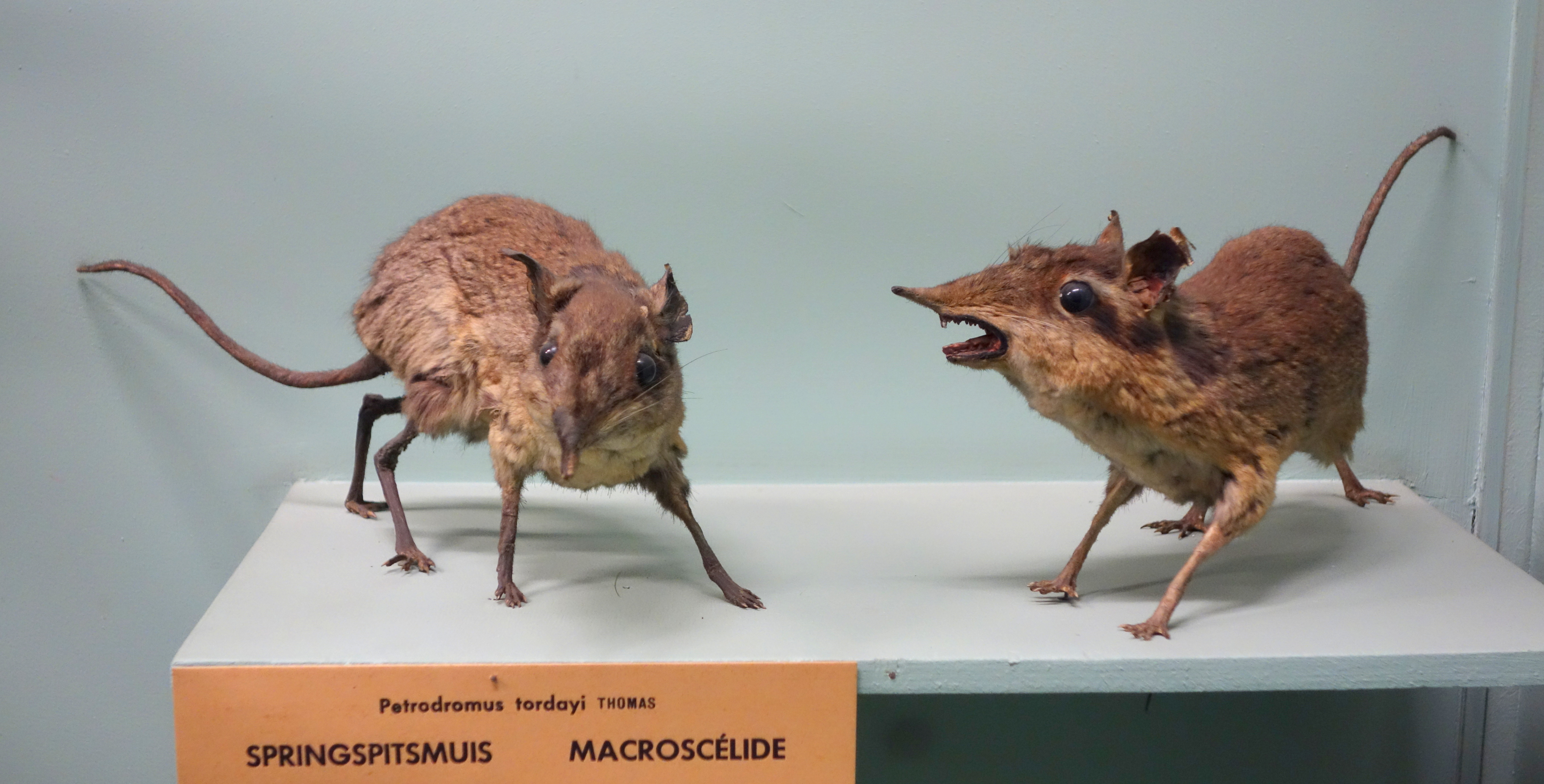
Stuffed specimens at the Royal Museum for Central Africa, Tervuren, Belgium

A four-toed sengi has long, soft fur and its color varies from greyish pale brown to dark brown with white rings around its eyes, and wide dark stripes on its back.

Markings of the four-toed sengi vary in colour: the upper parts of its feet are brownish-yellow; its ears are dark brown, with pure white hair on the base of the inner margin; the tail is black on the upper side and pale yellow-brown on the underside, darkening in the middle and almost black at tip. The four-toed sengi has a long, pointed, flexible and sensitive snout, which it uses to hunt. It also has short forelimbs and long back limbs.

The differences between the regular sengi and the four-toed sengi can be seen in facial features, body length and weight. Compared to the regular sengi, which has small eyes and ears, a four-toed sengi has broad, upstanding ears and large eyes. The sengi generally varies in size from about 10 to 30 cm (4 to 12 in). However, the body length of the four-toed sengi is less variable, 19 to 23 cm (7.5 to 9 in). Similarly, the tail length of the regular sengi is 8.0 to 26.5 cm (3.1 to 10.4 in), while tail length of the four-toed species is 15.5 to 17 cm (6.1 to 6.7 in).

The sengi is a small mammal weighing from 45 to 540 g (1.6 to 19.0 oz), while the four-toed sengi is one of largest sengis, weighing between 160 and 280 g (5.6 and 9.9 oz).

== Behaviour ==
The four-toed sengi is mostly active during the day and early evening, whereas during the night or midday, it tends to be less active. When the four-toed sengi runs, its tail points upwards; it also makes a noise through its hind feet. Ants react to this sound, which helps the four-toed sengi to locate its prey.

When four-toed sengis fight, they usually fight in pairs of the same gender. They fight in a "boxing" motion, supporting themselves on their rear legs and boxing with their front limbs to tackle one another. Four-toed sengis have good senses of sight, smell and hearing, but their vocal capacity is not well developed. In captivity, they make different kinds of sounds, such as screaming, purring or clucking for help.

== Diet ==
Four-toed sengis are heavily dependent on rich leaf litter composition for their food and nests. Their main prey are small invertebrates. Ants and termites are most common, as well as crickets, grasshoppers, spiders, centipedes, millipedes, and earthworms. Seeds, fruits, buds, and other plant material also form part of their diets. Four-toed sengis eat much like anteaters; they flick small foods into their mouths.

Based on where these four-toed sengis live, their main diets can vary. In Kenya, their diets include termites, plant matter, centipedes, ants, crickets and cockroaches, millipedes, spiders, and other similar creatures.

Some of the predators of the four-toed shrews are snakes, raptors, and carnivores, and in some cases, domestic cats.

== Reproduction ==
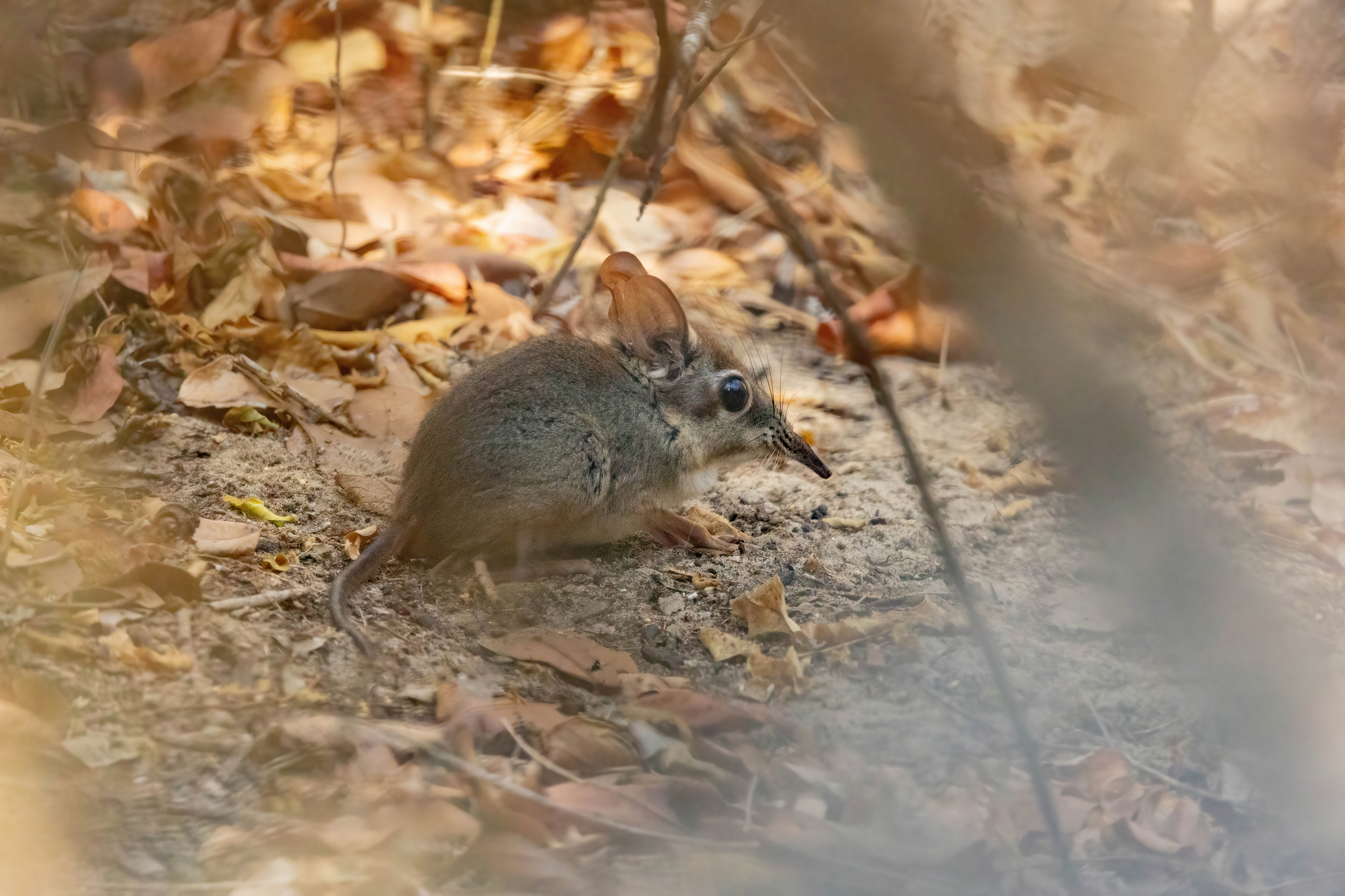
In Kenya

Depending on the quality of the habitat, four-toed sengis breed throughout the year, showing an increase in reproduction when more feeding grounds are accessible. The lowland forests and savannas offer shelter from the midday heat and resting places, as well as suitable birth places. Copulation typically occurs on land, and they are monogamous in nature. Their mating patterns involve sexual intercourse over several days, after which each mate returns to its solitary lifestyle. Gestation lasts between 40 and 60 days and one or two offspring are born. The young are born in a highly developed state and are weaned by their mothers after 15–25 days; the young reach full sexual maturity close to 50 days after birth. There are large granulated cells that occupy the walls of mesometrial and myometrial arteries. They are uterine natural killer cells. There is the persistence of a relatively larger yolk sac and large lobulated allantoic sac which is a feature shared with Petrodromus and other sengis.
