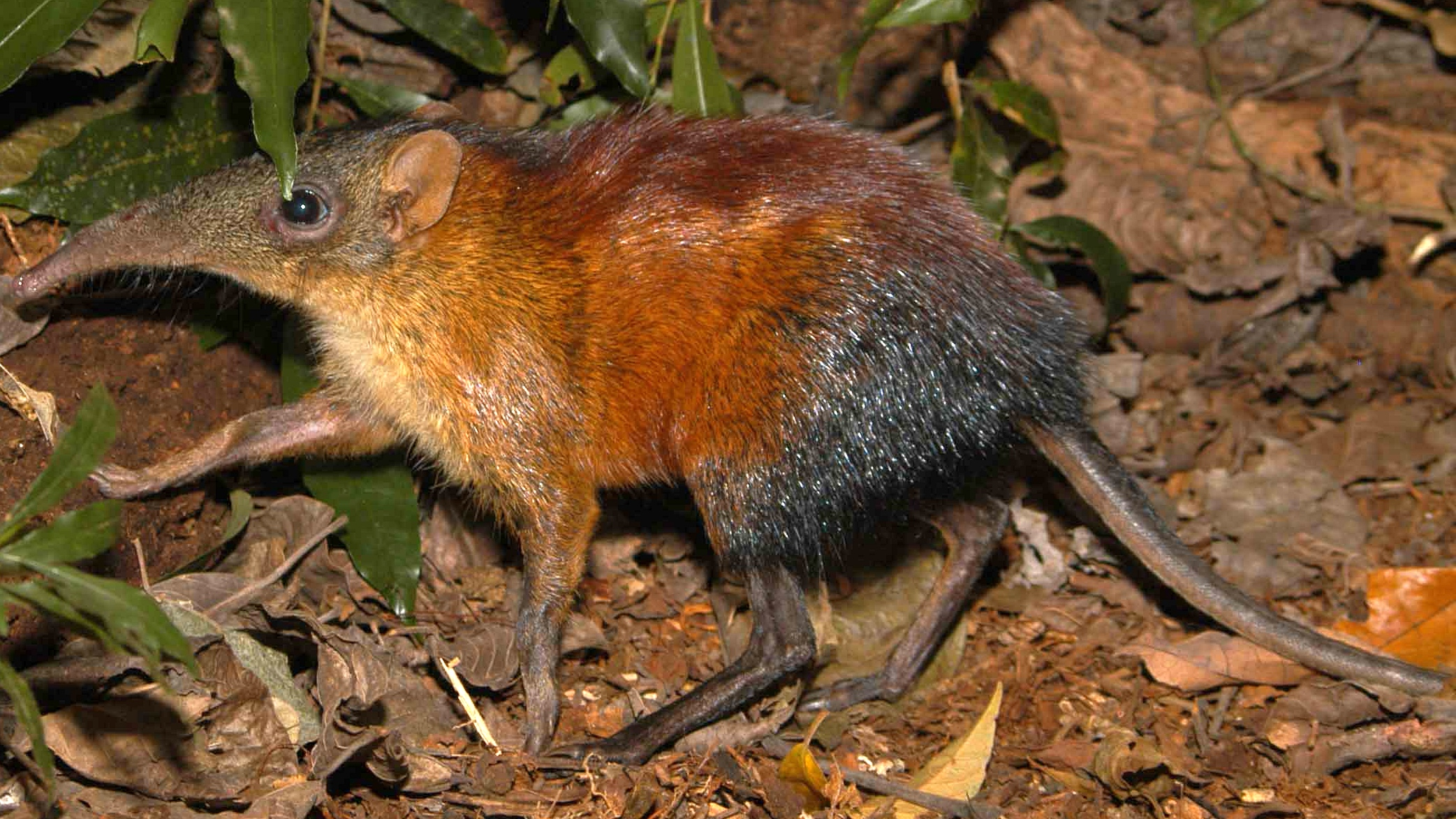

Conservation status
- Vulnerable (IUCN 3.1)

Scientific classification
- Kingdom: Animalia
- Phylum: Chordata
- Class: Mammalia
- Infraclass: Placentalia
- Order: Macroscelidea
- Family: Macroscelididae
- Genus: Rhynchocyon
- Species: R. udzungwensis

Binomial name
- Rhynchocyon udzungwensis F. Rovero and G. Rathbun, 2008
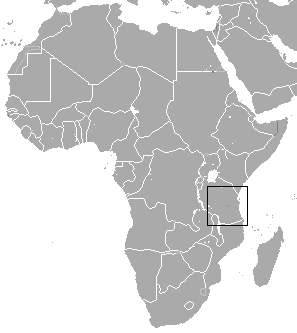
- Grey-faced sengi range

= Grey-faced sengi =

Species of sengi

The grey-faced sengi or grey-faced elephant shrew (Rhynchocyon udzungwensis) is a species of small mammal belonging to the sengi family (Macroscelididae). It is endemic to the Udzungwa Mountains of south-central Tanzania. The discovery of the species was announced in January 2008; only 15 species of sengi were known until then, and the last discovery was made more than 120 years ago. As the name implies, the species is characterised by a distinctive grey face and a black rump, as well as being larger than the other species of sengis.

== Description ==
The fur of this sengi is sparse and glossy with a gray facial coloration and bright red pelage. A wide maroon stripe is noted along the back of the animal, as well as jet-black hindquarters with a light brown belly and tail. In comparison to the other sengis, the grey-faced sengi is larger in proportion and the upper tooth row is longer. The mean length of this species is 56.4 cm (22.2 in), while the mean weight is 711 g (25.1 oz). At 700 g (1.5 lb), this species is about 25% larger than any other known sengi.

== Taxonomy ==
The grey-faced sengi is a species of the sengi or elephant shrew family (Macroscelididae), belonging to the genus Rhynchocyon. Its discovery was announced in 2008. Until this species was discovered, only 15 species of sengi were known, with the last living species having been described more than a century ago (the eastern rock sengi, Elephantulus myurus). The event therefore represents a rare discovery, not only for these animals, but also for mammals in general. The creature was found living in a small community in the high-altitude Ndundulu Forest in Tanzania's Udzungwa Mountains, an isolated area of great biodiversity, where a number of other new species have been discovered, including the Udzungwa partridge, a species of monkey called the kipunji, and several species of amphibians and reptiles.

This new species was first seen when caught on film in 2005 by Francesco Rovero of the Museum of Natural Sciences in Trento, Italy, who set up camera traps and captured an unfamiliar sengi. The results were sent to Galen Rathbun of the California Academy of Sciences. Rathbun, unable to identify the shrew, went on a two-week expedition with Rovero in March 2006 to search for specimens of the shrew. During the expedition, the zoologists were surprised by rain, though it was supposed to be the dry season. They then found the animal was larger than they had expected, and the traps they had brought would not contain it. Instead, they had to use traditional twine snares. "This is one of the most exciting discoveries of my career," Rathbun said. "It is the first new species of giant elephant-shrew to be discovered in more than 126 years. From the moment I first lifted one of the animals into our photography tent, I knew it must be a new species not just because of its distinct coloring, but because it was so heavy!"

Rathbun, Rovero, and coauthors published their description of the species in an issue of the British Journal of Zoology. The new species was given the binomial name Rhynchocyon udzungwensis (meaning 'snouted dog from Udzungwa'), and the English name grey-faced sengi from its physical characteristics. First captured video in 2007 on Mount Nandango, Tanzania by Tim Balazs and John Lochow was sent to Dr. Rathburn and confirmed to be the first video. Mount Nandango in roughly 400 km from the Rathburn site.

== Habitat ==
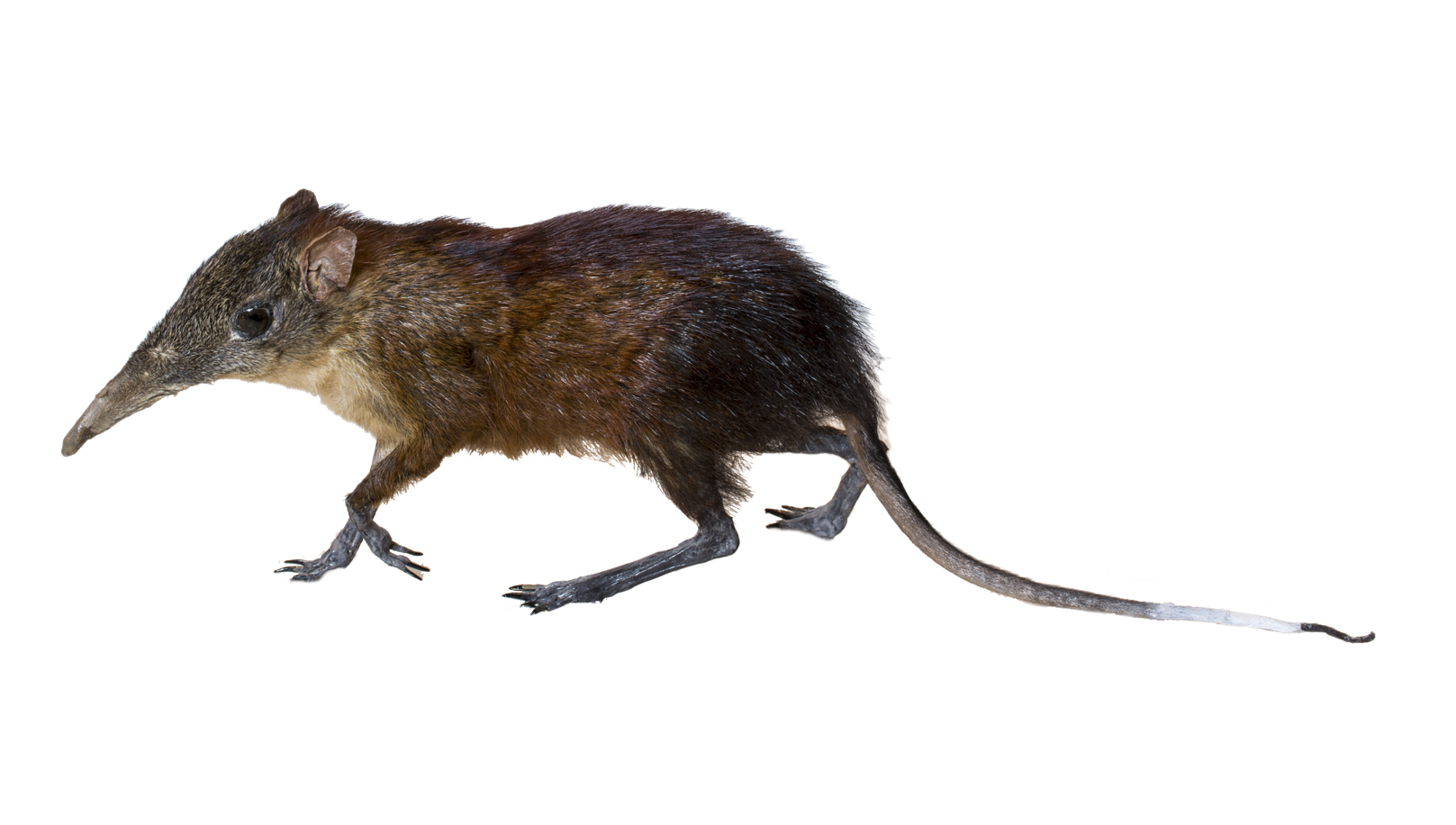
Taxidermied grey-faced sengi at MUSE - Science Museum in Trento

The grey-faced sengi is endemic to the Udzungwa Mountains of south-central Tanzania. The sengi ranges from the forests of Ndundulu-Lauhomero to the Mwanihana forests. The Udzungwa Mountains are one part in a series of isolated mountain ranges stretching from southern Kenya to the south-central part of Tanzania. Due to the isolation of these mountains, a wide range of species developed, many of which cannot be found anywhere else. Only two populations are known, existing within an area covering around 300 square kilometres (120 sq mi) of forest. The natural habitat of this species falls within two nature reserves: The Udzungwa Ecological Monitoring Centre and the Udzungwa Mountains National Park. The habitat of the grey-faced sengi consists mostly of terrestrial system with moist, submontane and montane evergreen to upper montane closed-canopy forests, including bamboo thickets.

== Reproduction ==
Rhynchocyon udzungwensis is believed to have a population size of about 15,000-24,000 individuals, with a density of 50-80 individuals per km^{2} and a 1:1 male to female ratio. This sengi builds a nest of leaves and soil with as many as five nests per tree; they are believed to have one or two infants per litter.

== Threats ==
The only major threat to the survival of the grey-faced sengi are humans. Expanding human populations in Africa, especially in Tanzania, will inevitably result in various pressures on the dwindling forests there and the species that live within that habitat. An indirect threat is human-set forest fires, because the sengi depends on its forest habitat. With so few individuals within the population, any form of habitat destruction can negatively affect the species greatly. Other theories to the endangerment of the species may be due to hunting by local tribes, but this cannot be proven and was not seen while Rathbun and Rovero visited Tanzania.

Conservation efforts include local community outreach programs. To save the species, the public is informed of the importance of preserving the sengi's natural habitat. This could reduce native hunting or habitat destruction. The habitat also falls between two nature reserves, which can allow the species to have extra protection from hunters and the ever-expanding human population. Since the nature reserves do not allow hunting or destruction of the forest and animals, the grey-faced sengi is almost guaranteed protection from the outside world. By providing accommodations and research resources to visiting scientists, these parks may give the sengi a better chance of survival.The parks are able to conserve species without concentrating on a specific species. By implementing monitoring programs, organizing training courses for rangers, scouts, park ecologists, and university students, promoting school education programs, networking with other monitoring initiatives and biological field stations elsewhere in Tanzania and the tropics, they standardize monitoring protocols and exchange data and information. Unfortunately no plan has yet been developed for the future protection or rehabilitation of the species.
