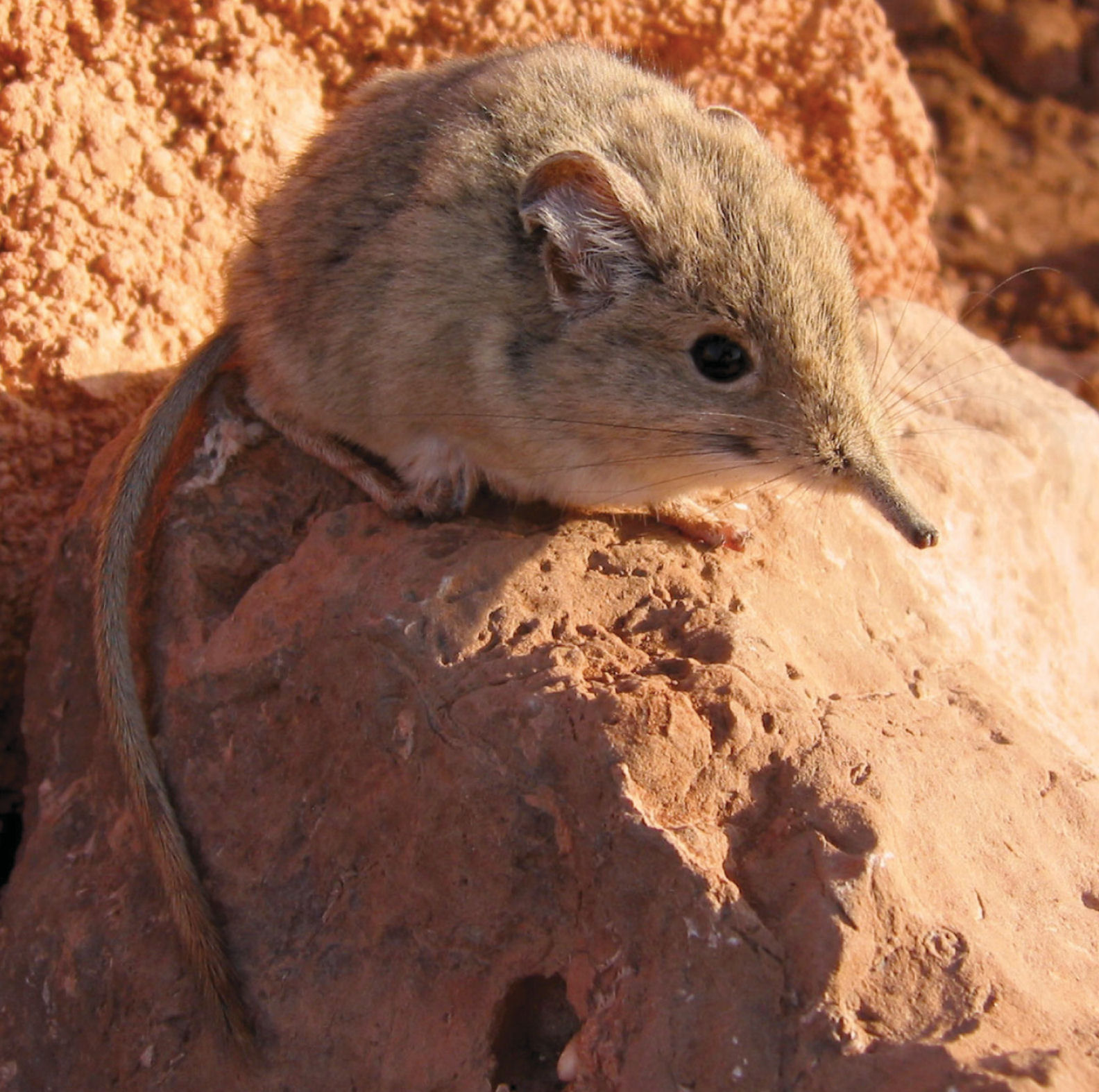

Conservation status
- Least Concern (IUCN 3.1)

Scientific classification
- Kingdom: Animalia
- Phylum: Chordata
- Class: Mammalia
- Infraclass: Placentalia
- Order: Macroscelidea
- Family: Macroscelididae
- Genus: Petrosaltator; Rathbun & Dumbacher, 2016
- Species: P. rozeti

Binomial name
- Petrosaltator rozeti (Duvernoy, 1833)
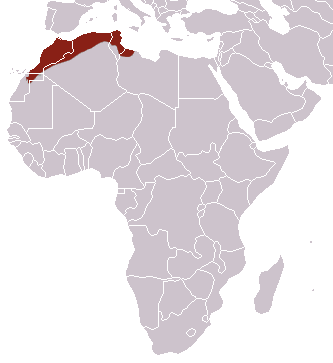
- North African sengi range

Synonyms
- Elephantulus rozeti (Duvernoy, 1833); Macroscelides rozeti Duvernoy, 1833

= North African sengi =

Species of mammal

The North African sengi or North African elephant shrew (Petrosaltator rozeti) is a small mammal belonging to the Macroscelididae. It is native to Algeria, Libya, Morocco, and Tunisia, and is the only extant afrotherian within its range.

== Taxonomy ==
The North African sengi was scientifically described by Georges Louis Duvernoy in 1833 under the name Elephantulus rozeti. Molecular evidence indicates that it is more closely related to the genus Petrodromus than to members of the genus Elephantulus; it was therefore moved to the new genus Petrosaltator in 2016. The split with Petrodromus likely occurred during the Miocene period.

== Description ==
The North African sengi is a small rodent-like in appearance, with a small body, large ears, and a long tail. It weighs around 50 g (1.8 oz), which is very light compared to other sengis. The total length is from 24 to 38.5 cm (9.4 to 15.2 in), of which the tail is 13 to 16 cm (5.1 to 6.3 in). The fur on the upper body varies from yellowish brown to pale sandy-pink, and the fur on the underside is white. It has a long flexible snout, which it can move in a circular fashion; the nostrils are located towards the tip of the snout, with long sensory whiskers growing at the base of the snout. The rear legs are longer than the forelimbs, an adaptation for running and jumping. It has 42 teeth, with a dental formula of 3.1.4.23.1.4.3.

== Distribution and habitat ==
The North African sengi is present in northwestern Africa from the northern Western Sahara to western Libya. Its natural habitats are Mediterranean-type shrubby vegetation and deserts.

== Behaviour and ecology ==
The North African sengi typically gives birth to litters of one to four young twice a year.
