= Galen Rathbun =

American zoologist

Galen B. Rathbun (June 24, 1944 – April 13, 2019) was a behavioral ecologist, noted as the co-discover of new species of elephant shrew.

In 1964, Rathbun received an Associate of Arts degree in zoology from College of San Mateo, in San Mateo, California. He received his B. A. degree from Humboldt State University (California) in 1966. After receiving his Ph.D. in zoology from the University of Nairobi in Kenya in 1976, he completed a postdoctoral fellowship at the National Zoo in Washington D.C. He is the author of over 130 technical publications.

From 1967 to 1970 he taught secondary school and at the National Museum in Kenya with the Peace Corps.

Rathbun and Francesco Rovero of the Museum of Natural Sciences in Trento, Italy, published their findings regarding a new species of mammal in the February issue of the British Journal of Zoology.

More recently Rathbun and colleagues have described a new sengi from Namibia, and revised the taxonomy of other taxa.
