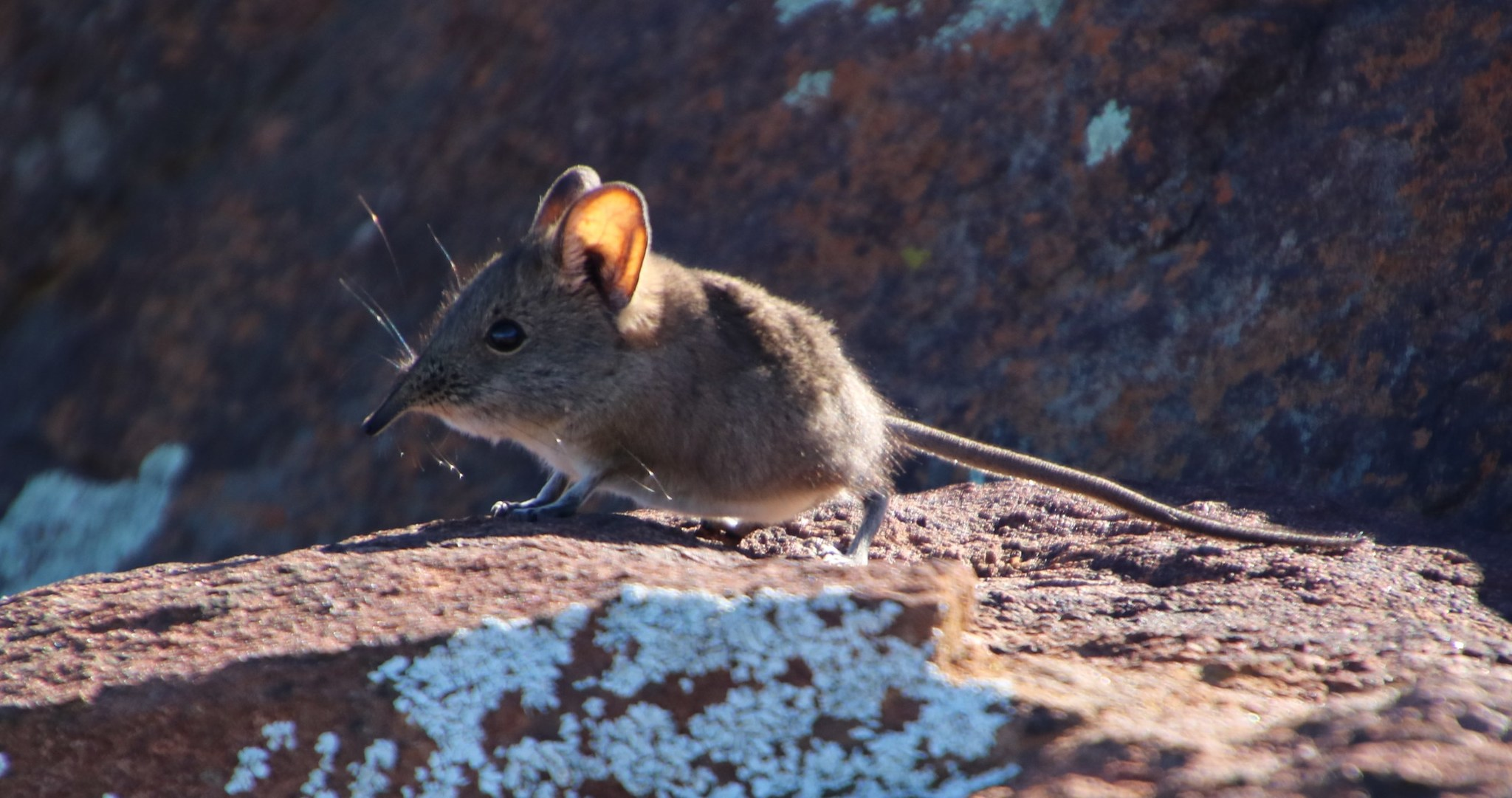

Conservation status
- Data Deficient (IUCN 3.1)

Scientific classification
- Kingdom: Animalia
- Phylum: Chordata
- Class: Mammalia
- Infraclass: Placentalia
- Order: Macroscelidea
- Family: Macroscelididae
- Genus: Elephantulus
- Species: E. pilicaudus

Binomial name
- Elephantulus pilicaudus Smit, 2008
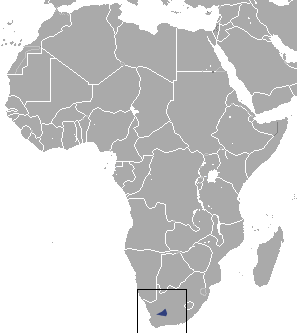
- Karoo rock sengi range

= Karoo rock sengi =

Species of mammal

The Karoo rock sengi or Karoo rock elephant shrew (Elephantulus pilicaudus) is a species of small mammal belonging to the sengi family (Macroscelididae). It is found in Northern Cape Province and Western Cape Province in South Africa. While they are endemic to South Africa region Nama-Karoo, their extent of occurrence has increased to 28% and recently has been widespread to Roggeveld vegetation types in Succulent Karoo.
