= Dusky-footed sengi =

Dusky-footed elephant shrew

Conservation status
- Data Deficient (IUCN 3.1)

Scientific classification
- Kingdom: Animalia
- Phylum: Chordata
- Class: Mammalia
- Infraclass: Placentalia
- Order: Macroscelidea
- Family: Macroscelididae
- Genus: Elephantulus
- Species: E. fuscipes

Binomial name
- Elephantulus fuscipes (Thomas, 1894)
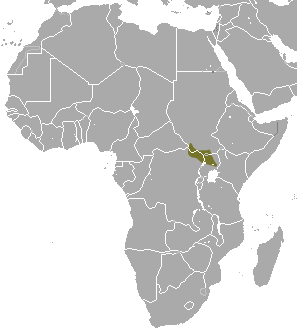
- Dusky-footed elephant shrew range

Species of mammal

The dusky-footed elephant shrew or dusky-footed sengi (Elephantulus fuscipes) is a species of small mammal belonging to the sengi family (Macroscelididae). It is found in Democratic Republic of the Congo, South Sudan, and Uganda. Its natural habitat is subtropical or tropical dry lowland grassland.
