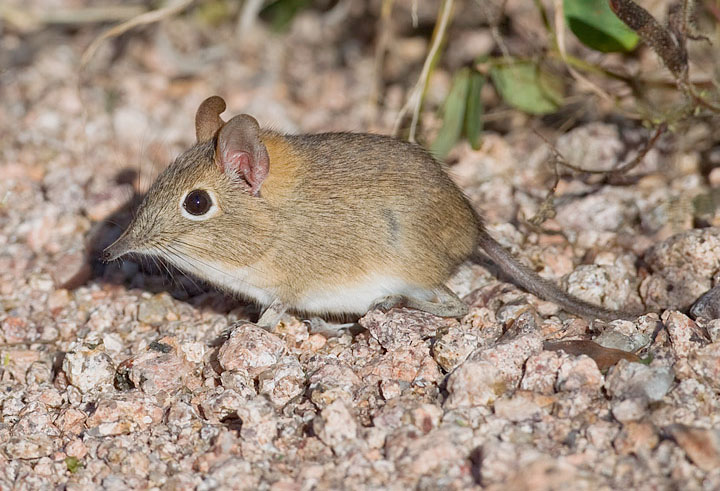

Conservation status
- Least Concern (IUCN 3.1)

Scientific classification
- Kingdom: Animalia
- Phylum: Chordata
- Class: Mammalia
- Infraclass: Placentalia
- Order: Macroscelidea
- Family: Macroscelididae
- Genus: Elephantulus
- Species: E. intufi

Binomial name
- Elephantulus intufi (A. Smith, 1836)
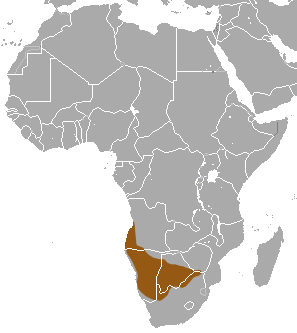
- Bushveld sengi range

= Bushveld sengi =

Species of mammal

The bushveld sengi or bushveld elephant shrew (Elephantulus intufi) is a species of small mammal belonging to the sengi family (Macroscelididae). It is found in Angola, Botswana, Namibia, and South Africa. Its natural habitats are subtropical or tropical dry shrubland and hot deserts.

== Behavior ==
The bushveld sengi live in monogamous pairs within their own territory away from other pairs which can be attributed as a result of male mate guarding. Even though they live as monogamous pairs, the bushveld sengi experience weak pair bonds.

According to the journal "Social Structure of the Bushveld Sengi (Elephantulus Intufi) in Namibia and the Evolution of Monogamy in the Macroscelidea" written by G. B. Rathburn and C.D. Rathburn, the behavioral ecology of sengis is best understood in the context of their evolutionary history. There is strong evidence that their phylogeny is due to Macroscelidea which is part of a monophyletic African clade of mammals that represents one of four early eutherian radiations.
