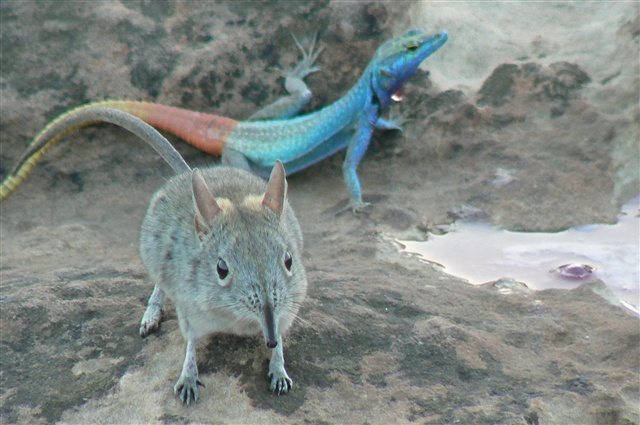
- Elephantulus, with a common flat lizard behind

Scientific classification
- Kingdom: Animalia
- Phylum: Chordata
- Class: Mammalia
- Order: Macroscelidea
- Family: Macroscelididae
- Genus: Elephantulus; Thomas & Schwann, 1906

Type species
- Macroscelides rupestris A. Smith, 1831

Species
- See text
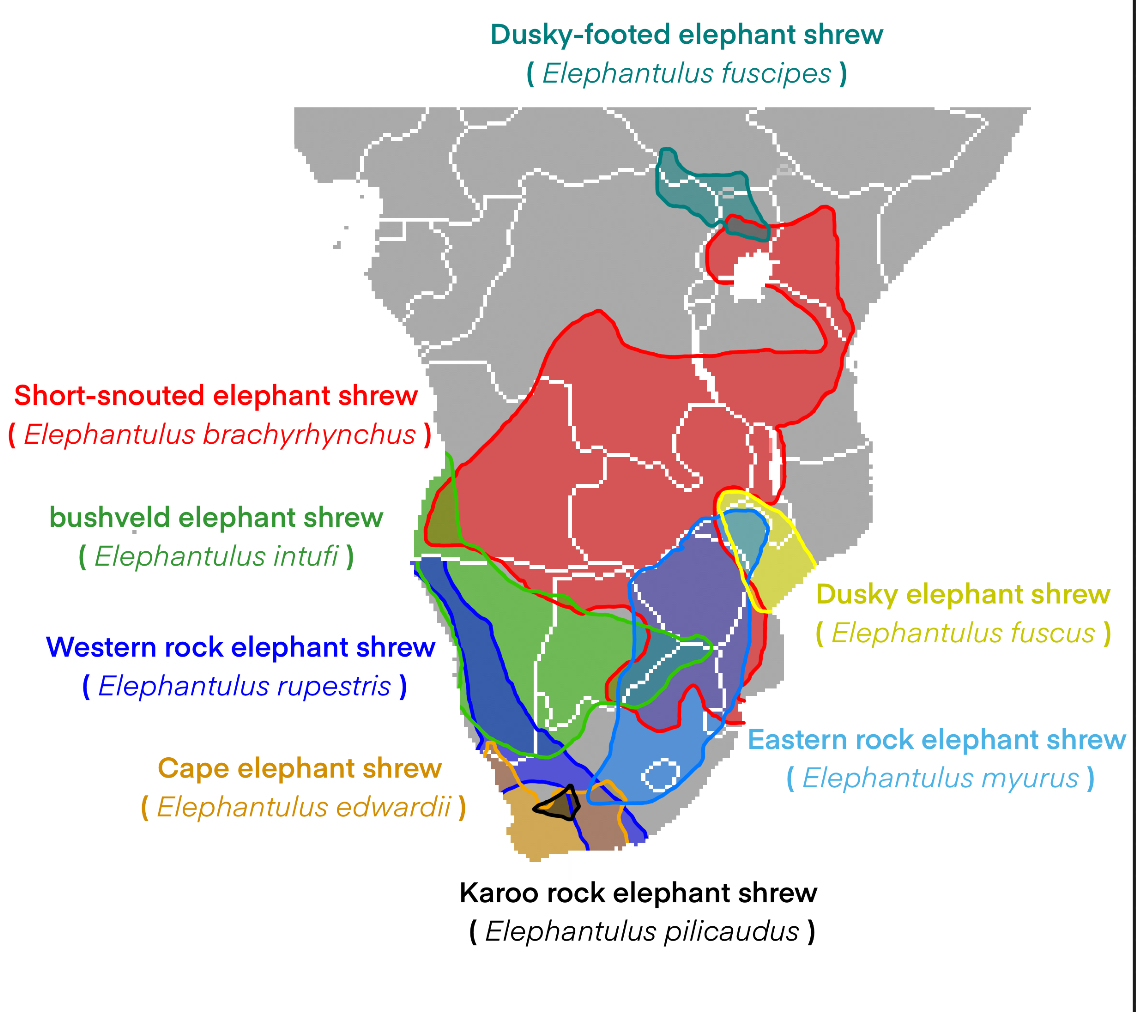

= Elephantulus =

Genus of mammals

Elephantulus is a genus of sengi, or elephant shrew, in the family Macroscelididae.

It contains the following species:

- Short-snouted sengi (E. brachyrhynchus)
- Cape sengi (E. edwardii)
- Dusky-footed sengi (E. fuscipes)
- Dusky sengi (E. fuscus)
- Bushveld sengi (E. intufi)
- Eastern rock sengi (E. myurus)
- Karoo rock sengi (E. pilicaudus)
- Western rock sengi (E. rupestris)
