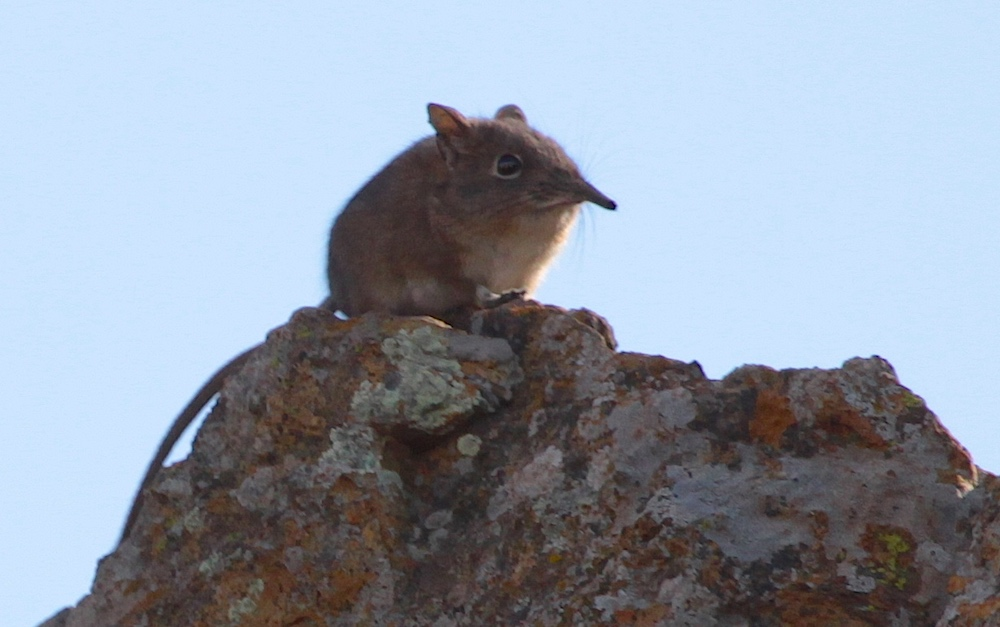
- On the rocky hill above Greylingstad, South Africa

Conservation status
- Least Concern (IUCN 3.1)

Scientific classification
- Kingdom: Animalia
- Phylum: Chordata
- Class: Mammalia
- Order: Macroscelidea
- Family: Macroscelididae
- Genus: Elephantulus
- Species: E. myurus

Binomial name
- Elephantulus myurus Thomas & Schwann, 1906
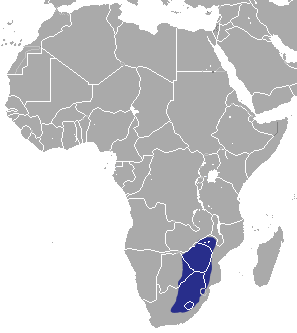
- Eastern rock sengi range

= Eastern rock sengi =

Species of mammal

The eastern rock sengi or eastern rock elephant shrew (Elephantulus myurus) is a species of sengi in the family Macroscelididae. It is found in Botswana, Mozambique, South Africa, and Zimbabwe. Its natural habitats are subtropical or tropical dry lowland grassland and rocky areas. Their foraging habitat mainly consists of rocky areas, and they prefer to eat insects.

== Breeding ==
Eastern rock sengis are one of three sengi species known to breed seasonally, during the spring and summer. Environmental factors that influence breeding patterns include temperature, rainfall, and lack of food. Mothers normally give birth to two sets of twins. Their young are known to walk very soon. Although rainfall affects food availability, it does not seem to have direct impact on female E. myurus reproduction. Rainfall and ambient temperature do affect male E. myurus reproduction.
