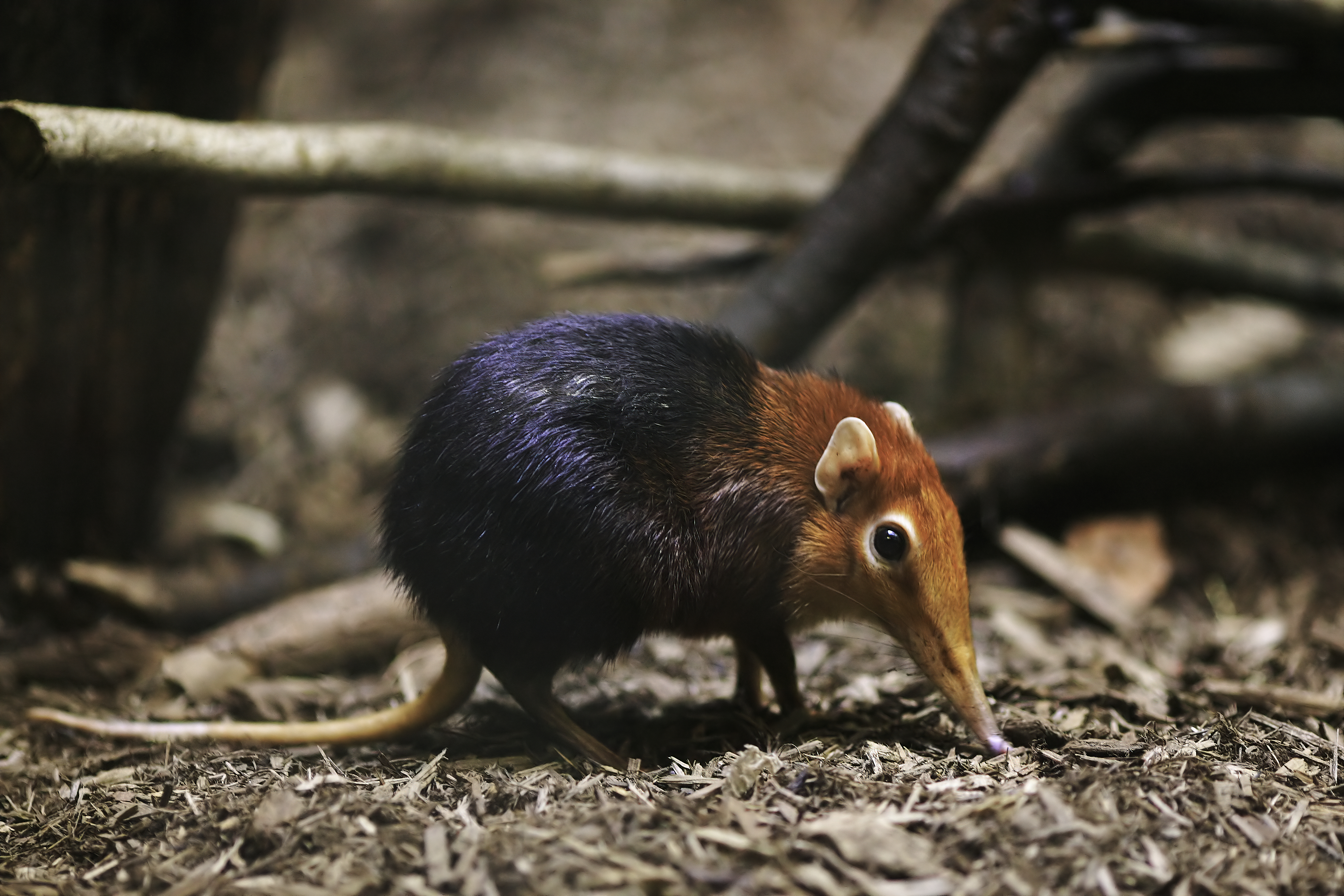
- Black and rufous sengi, Rhynchocyon petersi, Philadelphia Zoo
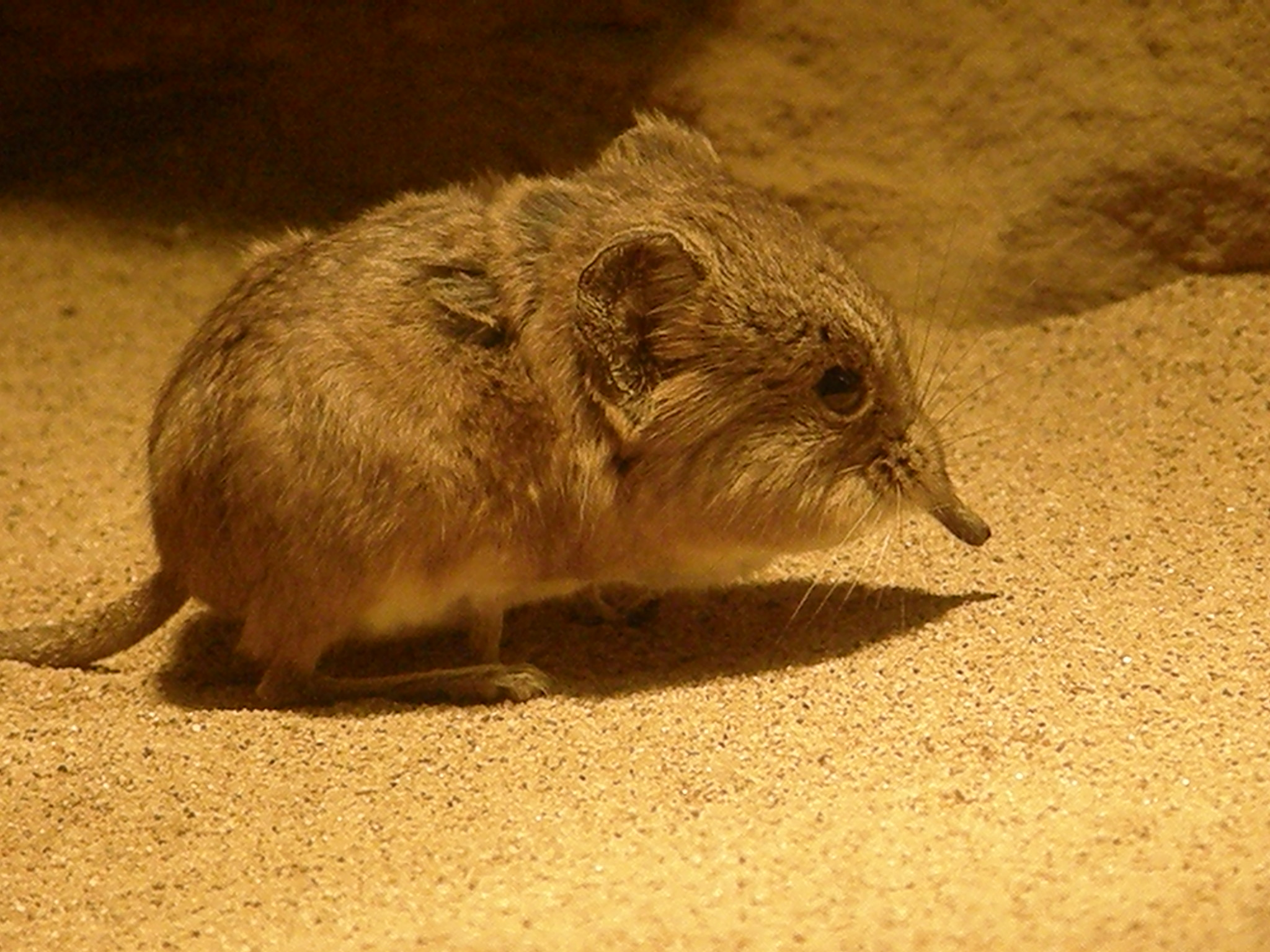
- Karoo round-eared sengi, Macroscelides proboscideus, Wuppertal Zoo

Scientific classification
- Kingdom: Animalia
- Phylum: Chordata
- Class: Mammalia
- Magnorder: Atlantogenata
- Superorder: Afrotheria
- Grandorder: Afroinsectiphilia
- Mirorder: Afroinsectivora
- Order: Macroscelidea; Butler, 1956
- Family: Macroscelididae; Bonaparte, 1838

Type genus
- Macroscelides A. Smith, 1829

Genera
- Elephantulus; Galegeeska; Macroscelides; Petrodromus; Petrosaltator; Rhynchocyon
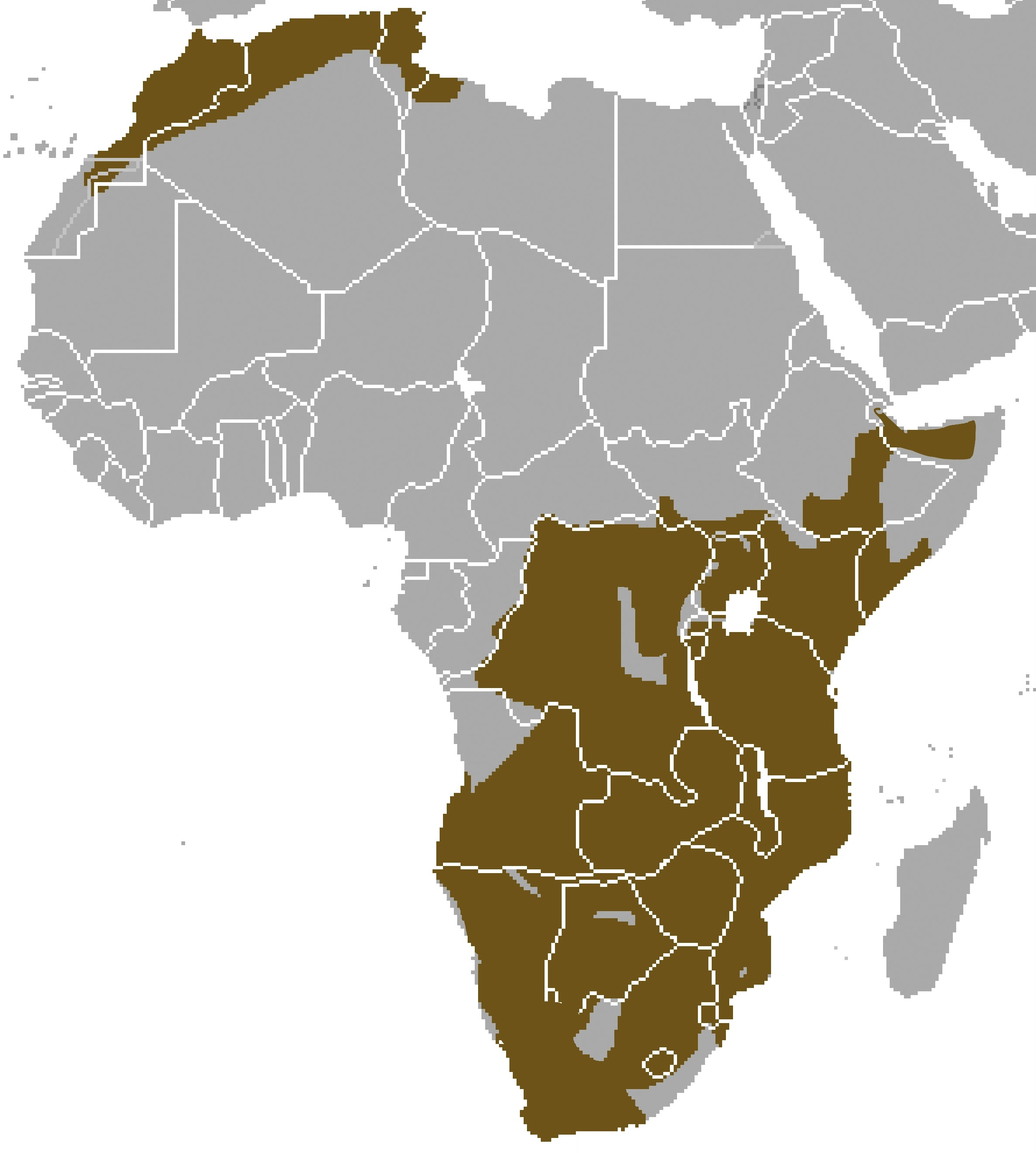

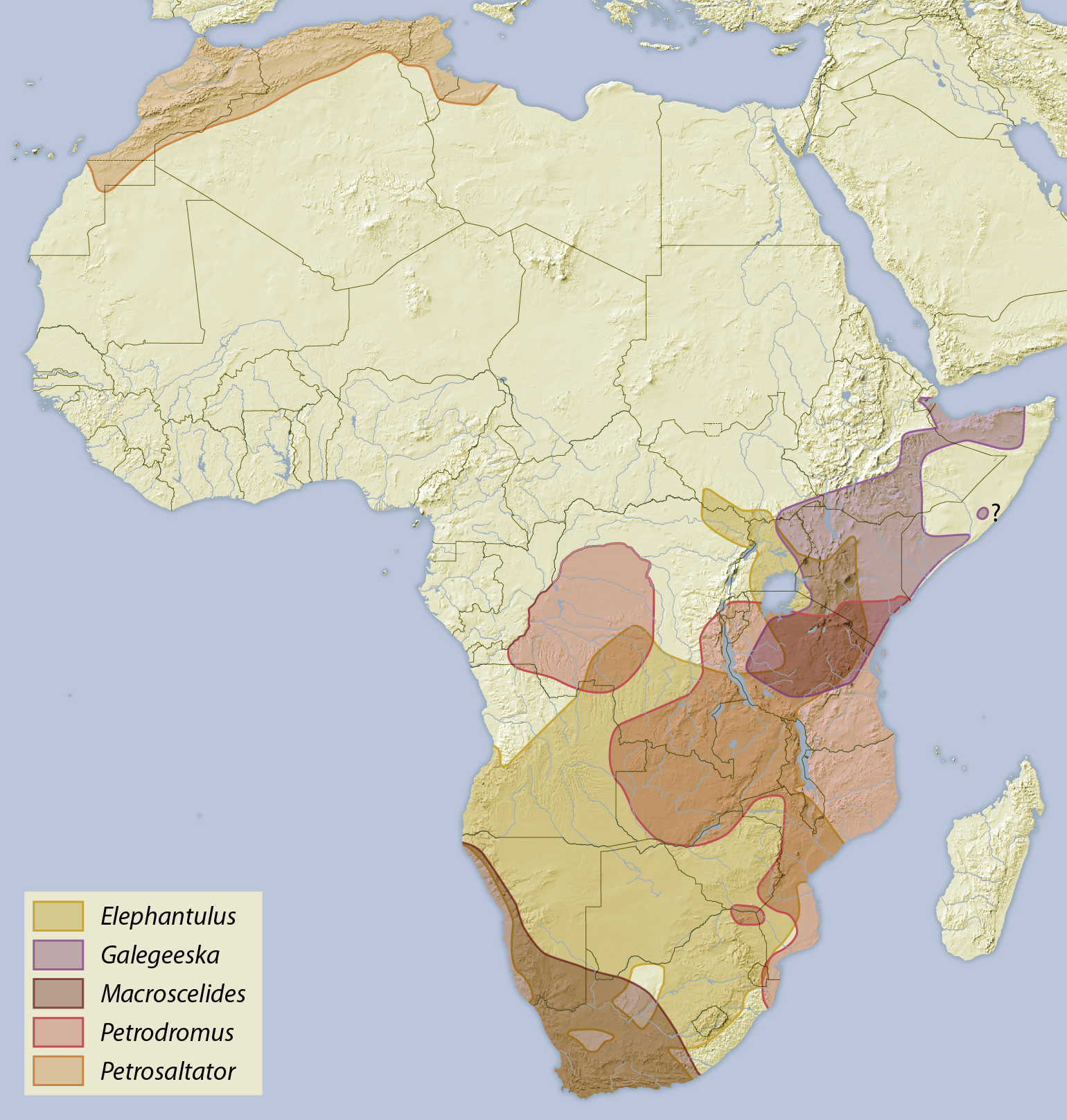
- Range map of sengi by genus

= Sengi =

Sengi Temporal range: 48–0 Ma

Family of insectivorous mammals

Sengis, also called elephant shrews or jumping shrews, are small insectivorous mammals native to Africa, belonging to the family Macroscelididae, in the order Macroscelidea. Their traditional common English name "elephant shrew" comes from a perceived resemblance between their long noses and the trunk of an elephant, and their superficial similarity with shrews (family Soricidae) in the order Eulipotyphla. However, phylogenetic analysis has revealed that the family was not properly classified with true shrews, in fact being more closely related to elephants. In 1997, the biologist Jonathan Kingdon proposed that they instead be called "sengis" (singular sengi), a term derived from the Bantu languages of Africa, and in 1998, they were classified into the new clade Afrotheria.

They are widely distributed across the southern part of Africa, and although common nowhere, can be found in almost any type of habitat, from the Namib Desert to boulder-strewn outcrops in South Africa to thick forest. One species, the North African sengi, remains in the semi-arid, mountainous country in the far northwest of Africa. The Somali sengi went unobserved from 1968 to 2020 but was rediscovered by a group of scientists in Djibouti.

== Description ==
Sengis are small, quadrupedal, insectivorous mammals. They have scaly tails, long snouts, and bear a superficial resemblance to shrews or rodents. They have long legs relative to their size, which are used to move from one place to another like rabbits. Sengis use their flexible proboscises to search for food, with the length of the snout varying between species.

They are one of the fastest small mammals, having been recorded to reach speeds of 28.8 kilometres per hour (17.9 mph). They vary in size from about 10 to 30 centimetres (3.9 to 11.8 in), from 50 to 500 grams (1.8 to 17.6 oz). One species of giant sengi, the grey-faced sengi, weighs about 700 g. Compared to other mammalian insectivores, sengis have relatively large brains. Their lifespans are about two and a half to four years in the wild. They have large canine teeth, and also high-crowned cheek teeth similar to those of ungulates. Their dental formula is 1-3.1.4.23.1.4.2-3.

== Behavior and ecology ==
Although mostly diurnal and very active, they are difficult to trap and very seldom seen; sengis are wary, well camouflaged, and adept at dashing away from threats. Several species make a series of cleared pathways through the undergrowth and spend their day patrolling them for insect life. If the animal is disturbed, the pathway provides an obstacle-free escape route.

Sengis are solitary animals, despite many species living in monogamous pairs. They share and defend their home territory, which is marked using their scent glands. Scent markings are also used for mate attraction.

Short-eared sengis inhabit the dry steppes and stone deserts of southwestern Africa. They can even be found in the Namib Desert, one of the driest regions of the earth. Females drive away other females, while males try to ward off other males. Although they live in pairs, the partners do not care much for each other and their sole purpose of even associating with the opposite sex is for reproduction. Social behaviors are not very common and they even have separate nests. The one or two young are well developed at birth; they are able to run within a few hours.

Female sengis undergo a menstrual cycle similar to that of human females, making it one of the few nonprimate mammals to do so. Sengis were used in the 1940s to study the human menstruation cycle. The sengi mating period lasts for several days. After mating, the pair will return to their solitary habits. After a gestation period varying from 45 to 60 days, the female will bear litters of one to three young several times a year. The young are born relatively well developed, but remain in the nest for several days before venturing outside.

After five days, the young's milk diet is supplemented with mashed insects, which are collected and transported in the cheek pouches of the female. The young then slowly start to explore their environment and hunt for insects. After about 15 days, the young will begin the migratory phase of their lives, which lessens their dependency on their mother. The young will then establish their own home ranges (about 1 km^{2} (0.39 sq mi)) and will become sexually active within 41–46 days.

The thermal characteristics of sengis with similar body size, habitat and distribution are very close in most of the classifications. They can maintain homeothermy in different ambient temperatures where most of the species regulate their body temperature at 35 °C and neither become hyperthermic but they balance the heat offload by increasing the EWL (evaporative water loss).

=== Feeding habits ===
Sengis mainly eat insects, spiders, centipedes, millipedes, and earthworms. While awake, as much as 80% of their time may be spent foraging. A sengi uses its nose to find prey and uses its tongue to flick small food into its mouth, much like an anteater. Eating large prey can pose a challenge; a sengi struggling with an earthworm must first pin its prey to the ground with a forefoot. Then, turning its head to one side, it chews pieces off with its cheek teeth, much like a dog chewing a bone. This is a sloppy process, and many small pieces of worm drop to the ground; these are simply flicked up with the tongue. Some sengis also feed on small amounts of plant matter, especially new leaves, seeds, and small fruits.

== Evolution ==
A number of fossil species are known, all from Africa. They were separate from the similar-appearing order Leptictida. A considerable diversification of macroscelids occurred in the Paleogene period. The earliest definitive member was Chambia from the early-middle Eocene of Tunisia. Some early macroscelids, such as Myohyrax, were so similar to hyraxes that they were initially included with that group, while others, such as Mylomygale, were relatively rodent-like. These unusual forms all died out by the Pleistocene. Although macroscelids were classified in the past with many groups, often on the basis of superficial characteristics, considerable morphological and molecular evidence places them within Afrotheria, at the base of Afroinsectivora.

In terms of timing, the divergence between macroscelids and afrosoricidans is thought to have occurred roughly 57.5 million years (Ma) ago, in the late Paleocene, while the diversification of extant macroscelids apparently began when the Rhynchocyon lineage split off about 33 Ma ago, in the early Oligocene. Elephantulus is considered to have separated from Macroscelidini later in the Oligocene, about 28.5 Ma ago.

== Phylogeny ==
- Afrotheria
  - Paenungulata
    - Hyracoidea
      Procaviidae
    - Tethytheria
      - Sirenia
        - Trichechidae
        - Dugongidae
      - Proboscidea
        Elephantidae
  - Afroinsectiphilia
    - Tubulidentata
      Orycteropodidae
    - Afroinsectivora
      - Macroscelidea
        Macroscelididae
      - Afrosoricida
        - Chrysochloridae
        - Tenrecomorpha
          - Tenrecidae
          - Potamogalidae

A cladogram of Afrotheria based on molecular evidence

Cladogram of living elephant shrews

- Macroscelididae
  - Rhynchocyoninae
    - Rhynchocyon
      - R. chrysopygus
      - - - R. cirnei
          - R. stuhlmanni
        - - R. petersi
          - R. udzungwensis
  - Macroscelidinae
    - - Macroscelidini
        - - Galegeeska
            - G. revoilii
            - G. rufescens
          - - Petrosaltator rozeti
            - Petrodromus tetradactylus
        - Macroscelides
          - - M. flavicaudatus
            - M. proboscideus
          - M. micus
      - Elephantulus
        - - E. rupestris
          - - E. intufi
            - E. brachyrhynchus
        - - - E. edwardii
            - E. pilicaudus
          - E. myurus

== Classification ==
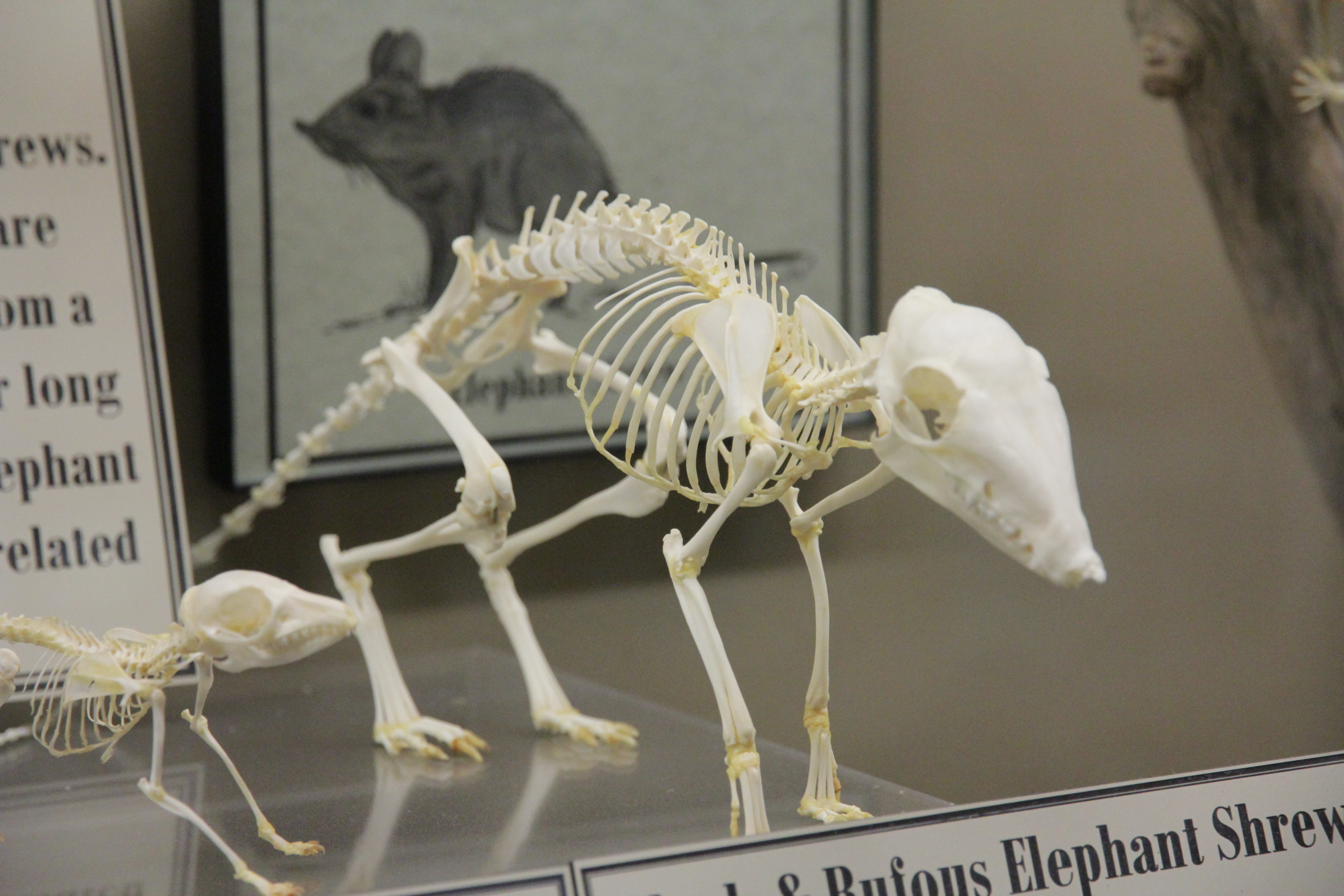
R. petersi skeleton, Museum of Osteology

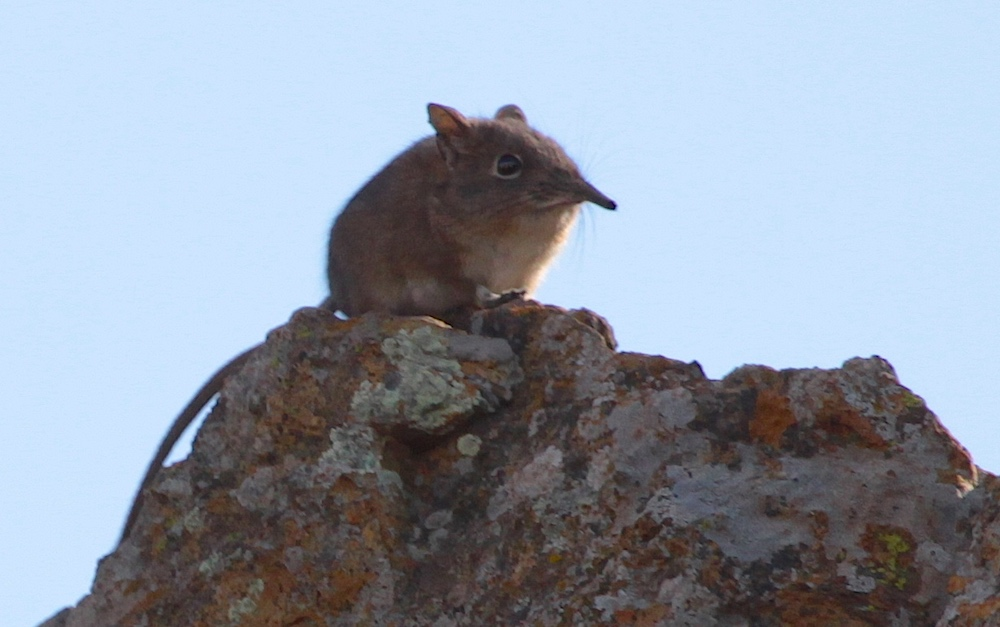
Eastern rock elephant shrew, Elephantulus myurus, South Africa

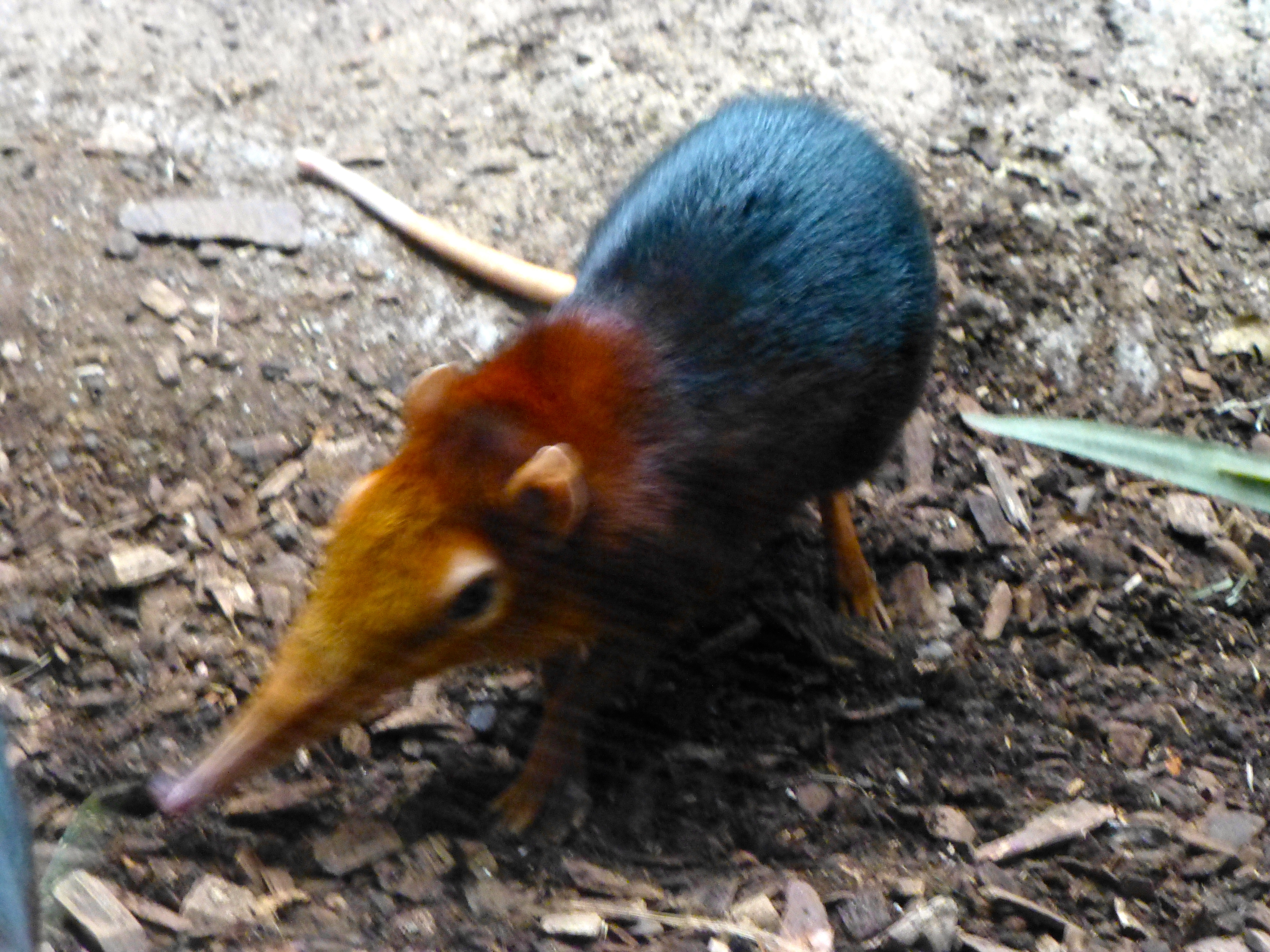
Black and rufous elephant shrew, Rhynchocyon petersi, Rotterdam Zoo

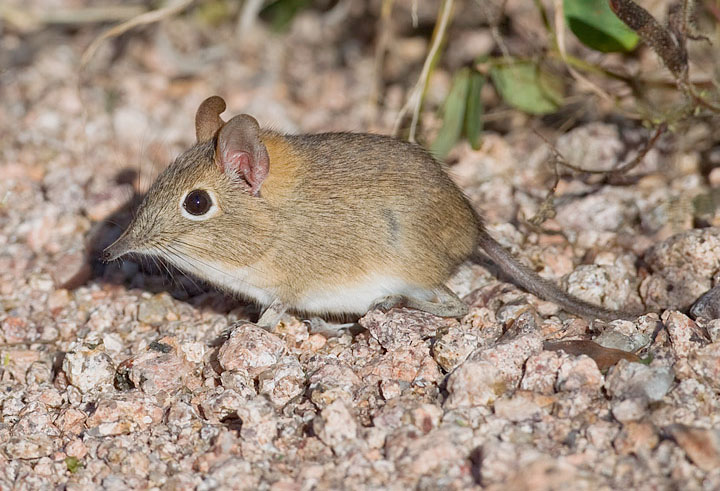
Bushveld elephant shrew, E. intufi, Namibia

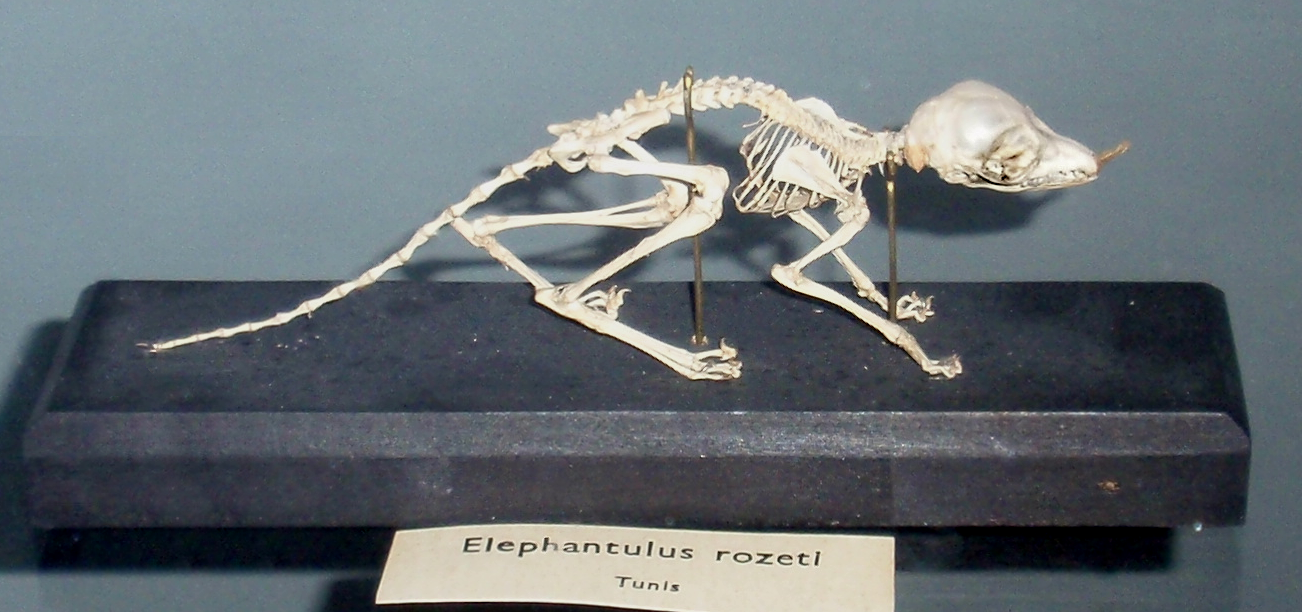
Skeleton of North African sengi.

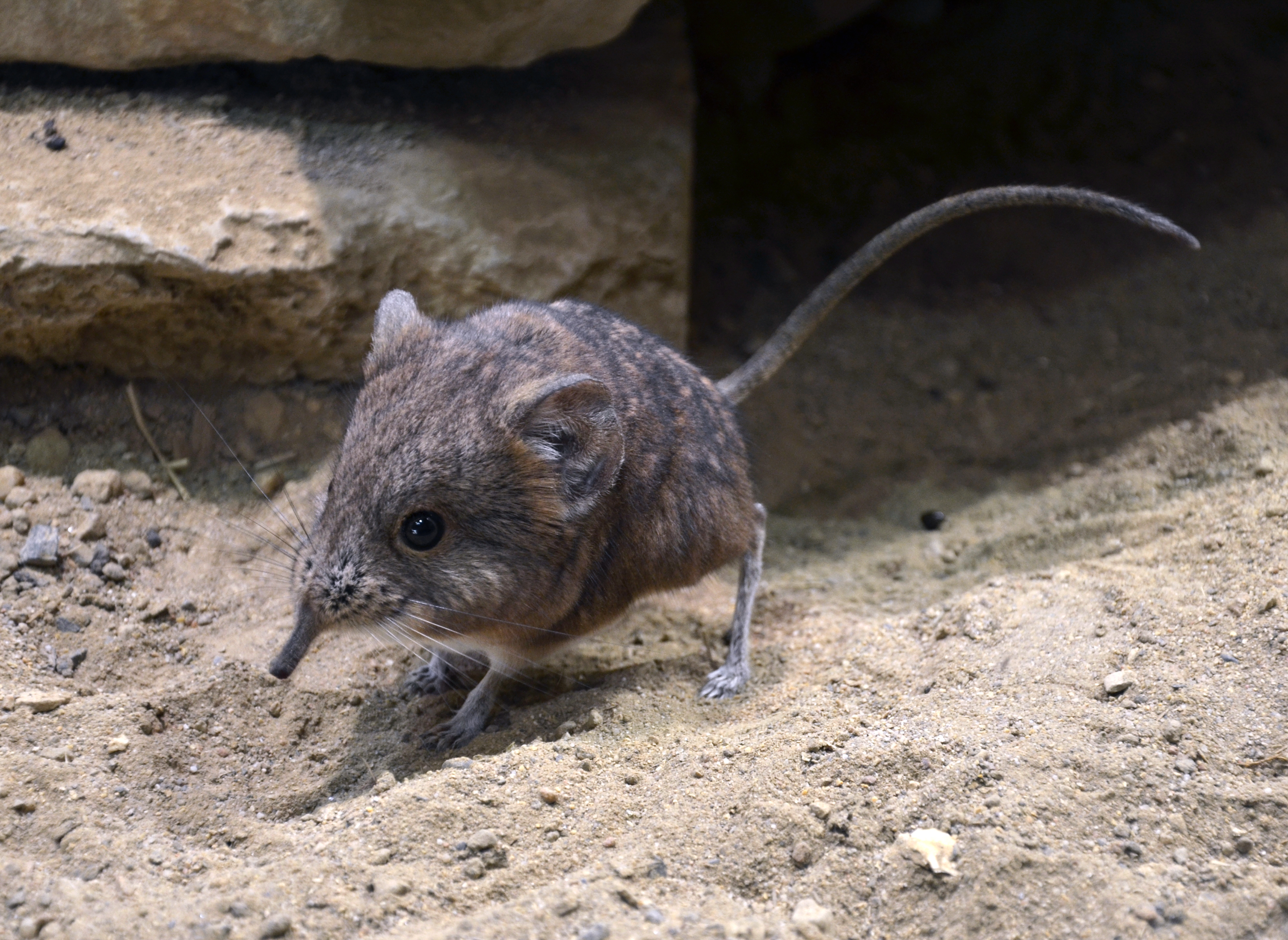
Round-eared sengi, Macroscelides proboscideus, Basel Zoo

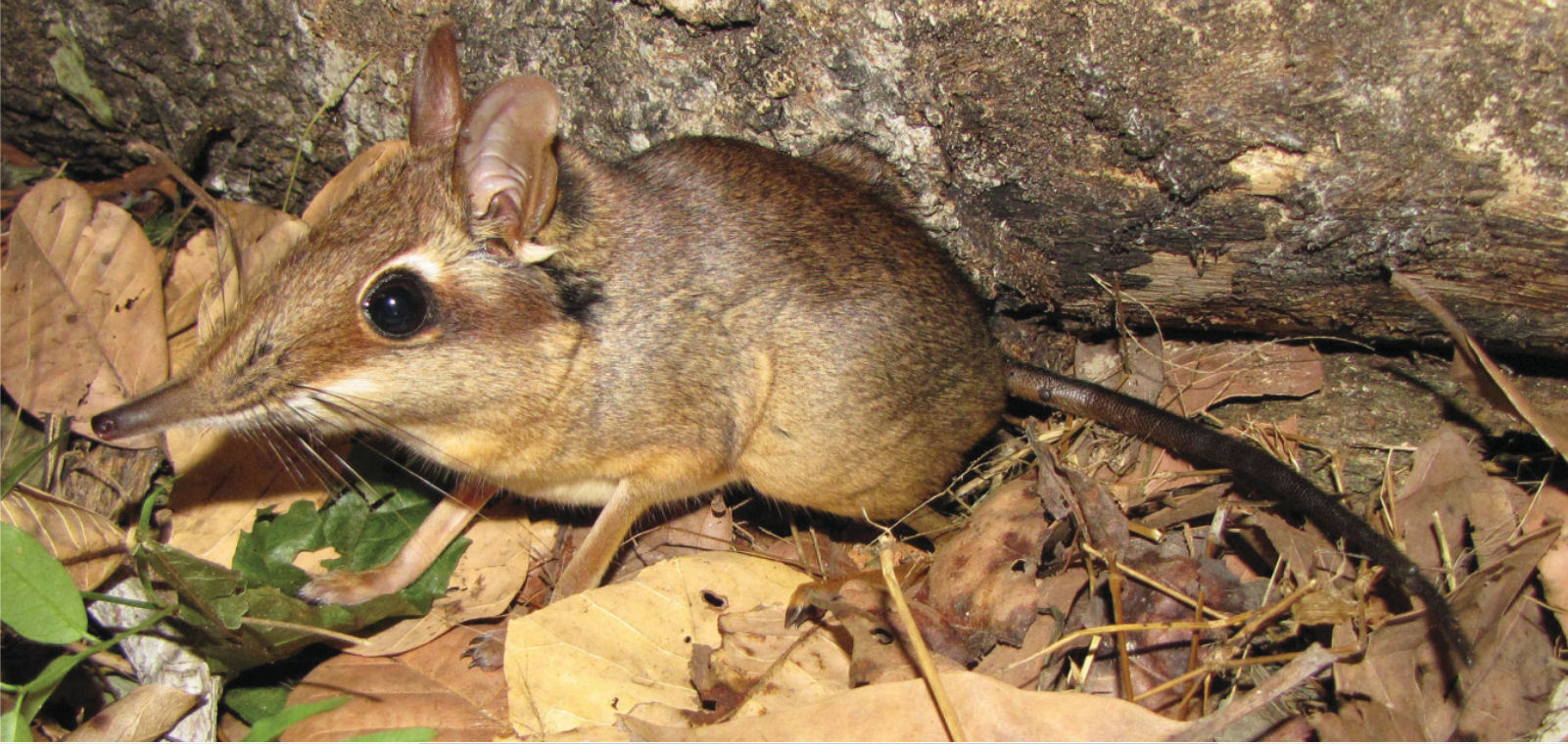
Four-toed sengi, Petrodromus tetradactylus, Mozambique

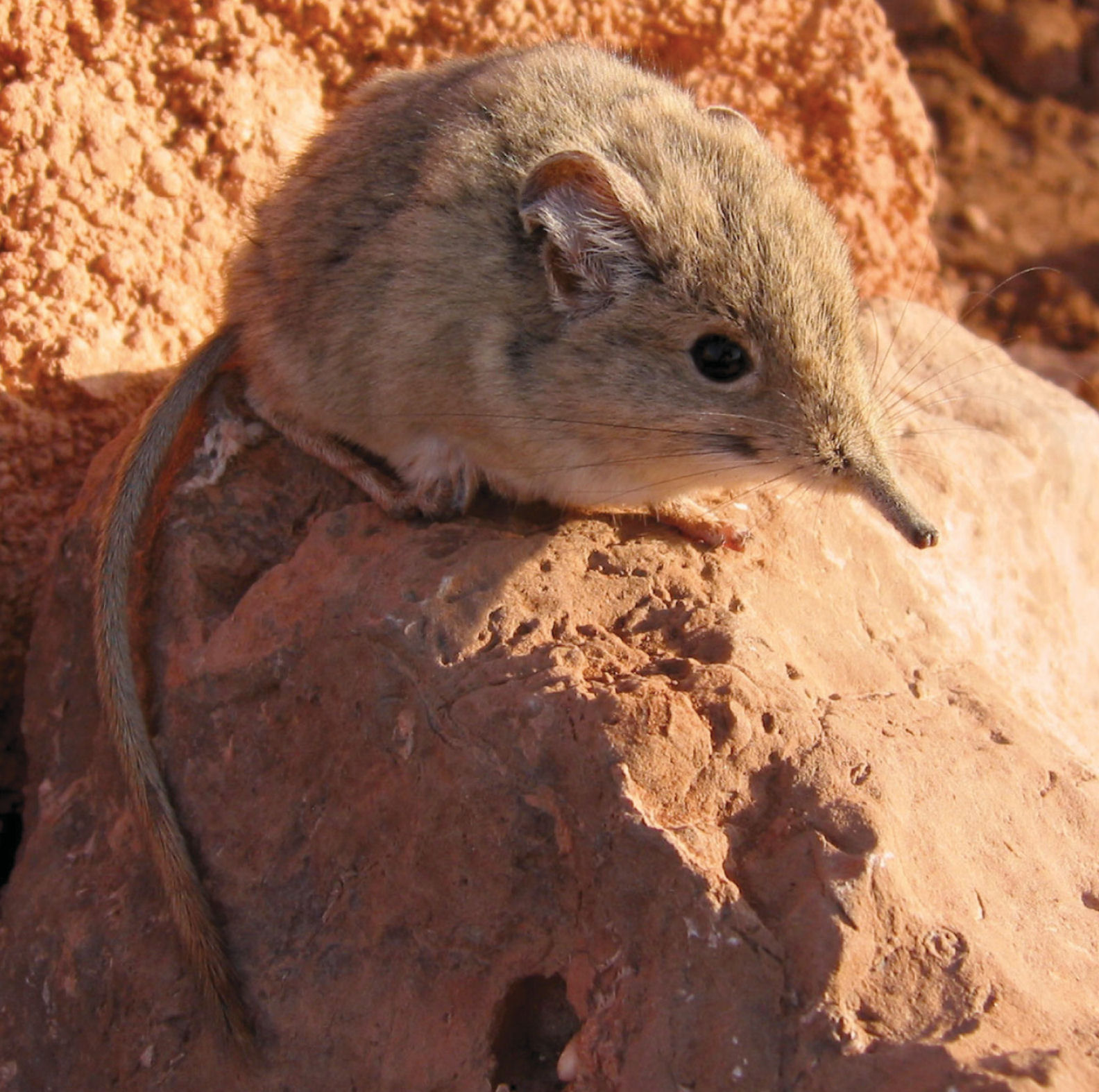
North African sengi, Petrosaltator rozeti, Morocco

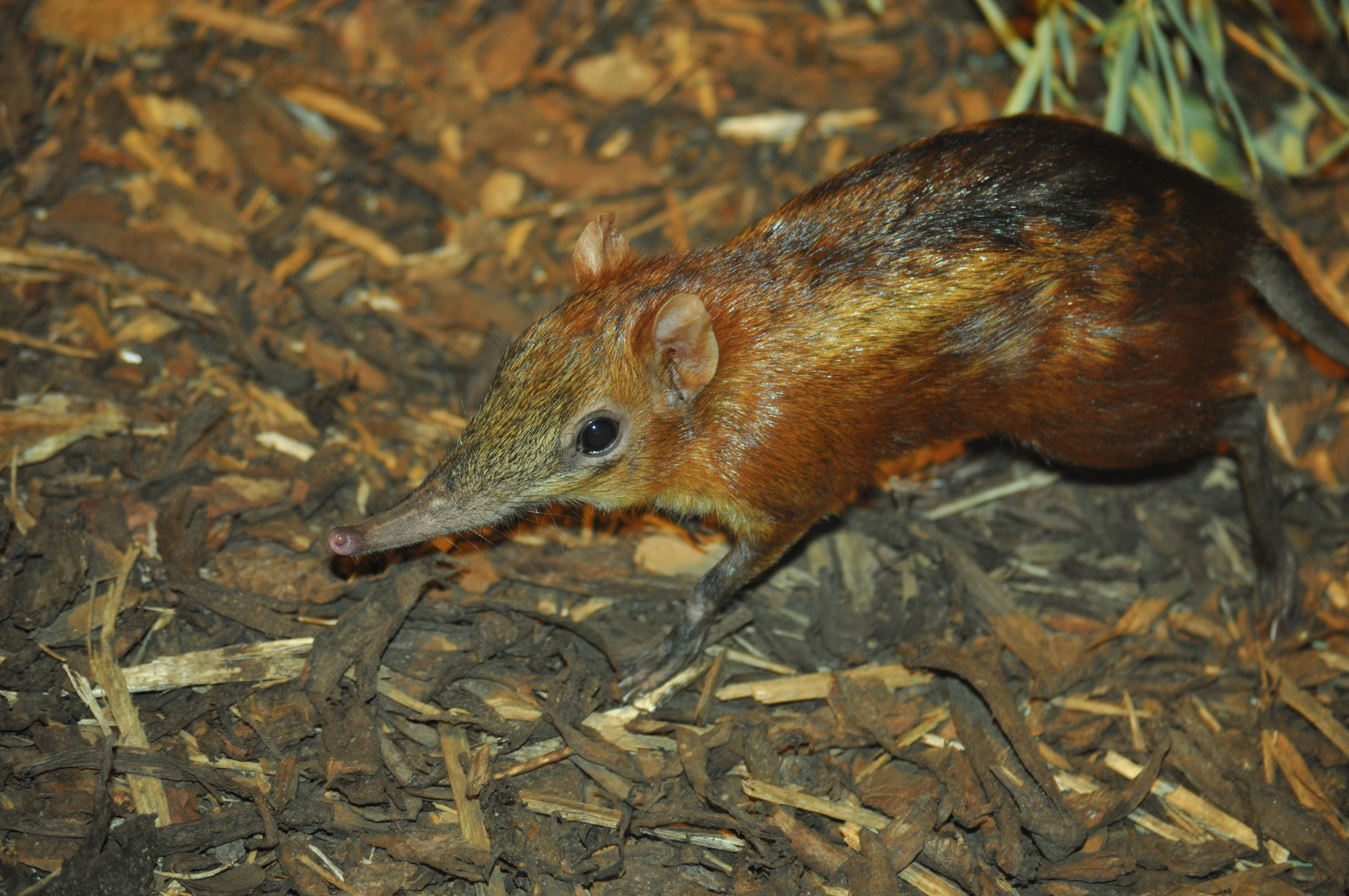
Checkered elephant shrew, Rhynchocyon cirnei, Prague Zoo

The 20 species of sengi are placed in six genera, three of which are monotypic:

- ORDER MACROSCELIDEA
  - Family Macroscelididae
    - Genus Elephantulus
      - Short-snouted sengi, E. brachyrhynchus
      - Cape rock sengi, E. edwardii
      - Dusky-footed sengi, E. fuscipes
      - Dusky sengi, E. fuscus
      - Bushveld sengi, E. intufi
      - Eastern rock sengi, E. myurus
      - Karoo rock sengi, E. pilicaudus
      - Western rock sengi, E. rupestris
    - Genus Galegeeska
      - Somali sengi, G. revoilii
      - Rufous sengi, G. rufescens
    - Genus Macroscelides
      - Namib round-eared sengi, M. flavicaudatus
      - Etendeka round-eared sengi, M. micus
      - Round-eared sengi, M. proboscideus
    - Genus Petrodromus
      - Four-toed sengi, P. tetradactylus
    - Genus Petrosaltator
      - North African sengi, P. rozeti
    - Genus Rhynchocyon
      - Golden-rumped sengi, R. chrysopygus
        - Rhynchocyon chrysopygus mandelai
      - Chequered sengi, R. cirnei
        - Rhynchocyon cirnei cirnei
        - Rhynchocyon cirnei shirensis
        - Rhynchocyon cirnei reichardi
        - Rhynchocyon cirnei hendersoni
        - Rhynchocyon cirnei macrurus
      - Black and rufous sengi, R. petersi
        - Rhynchocyon petersi petersi
        - Rhynchocyon petersi adersi
      - Stuhlmann's sengi, R. stuhlmanni
      - Grey-faced sengi, R. udzungwensis
