= List of mammals of Botswana =

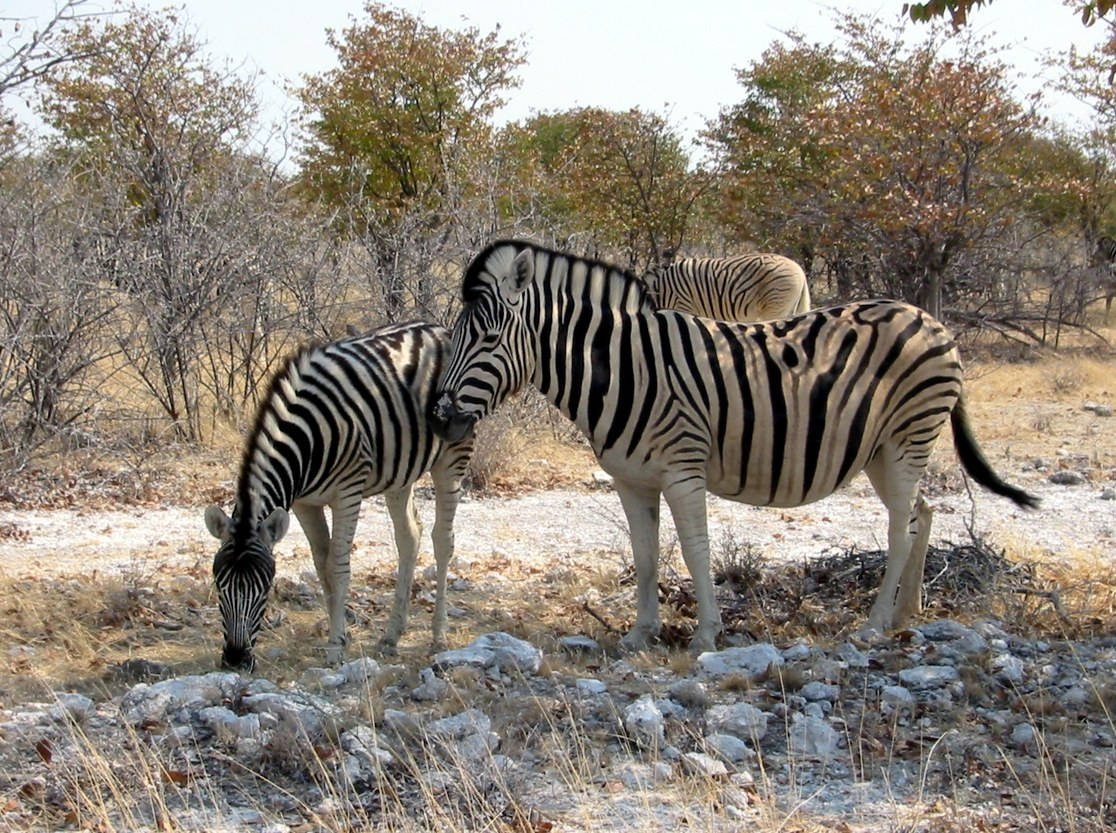
Burchell's zebra, Equus quagga burchellii, is the national animal of Botswana.

This is a list of the mammal species recorded in Botswana. There are 170 mammal species in Botswana, of which one is critically endangered, one is endangered, six are vulnerable, and six are near threatened.

The following tags are used to highlight each species' conservation status as assessed by the International Union for Conservation of Nature:

EX	Extinct	No reasonable doubt that the last individual has died.
EW	Extinct in the wild	Known only to survive in captivity or as a naturalized populations well outside its previous range.
CR	Critically endangered	The species is in imminent risk of extinction in the wild.
EN	Endangered	The species is facing an extremely high risk of extinction in the wild.
VU	Vulnerable	The species is facing a high risk of extinction in the wild.
NT	Near threatened	The species does not meet any of the criteria that would categorise it as risking extinction but it is likely to do so in the future.
LC	Least concern	There are no current identifiable risks to the species.
DD	Data deficient	There is inadequate information to make an assessment of the risks to this species.

Some species were assessed using an earlier set of criteria. Species assessed using this system have the following instead of near threatened and least concern categories:

LR/cd	Lower risk/conservation dependent	Species which were the focus of conservation programmes and may have moved into a higher risk category if that programme was discontinued.
LR/nt	Lower risk/near threatened	Species which are close to being classified as vulnerable but are not the subject of conservation programmes.
LR/lc	Lower risk/least concern	Species for which there are no identifiable risks.

== Subclass: Theria ==
=== Infraclass: Eutheria ===
==== Order: Macroscelidea (elephant shrews) ====
Often called sengi, the elephant shrews or jumping shrews are native to southern Africa. Their common English name derives from their elongated flexible snout and their resemblance to the true shrews.

- Family: Macroscelididae (elephant shrews)
  - Genus: Elephantulus
    - Short-snouted elephant shrew, E. brachyrhynchus LC
    - Bushveld elephant shrew, E. intufi LC
    - Eastern rock elephant shrew, E. myurus LC
    - Western rock elephant shrew, E. rupestris LC
  - Genus: Macroscelides
    - Short-eared elephant shrew, M. proboscideus LC

==== Order: Tubulidentata (aardvarks) ====
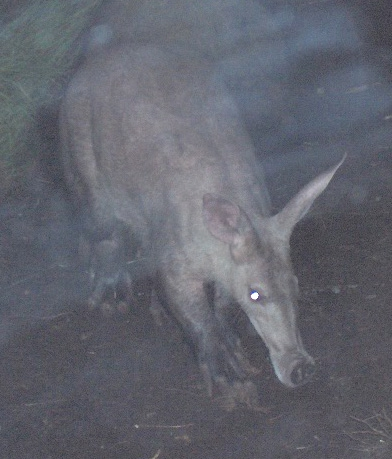
Aardvark

The order Tubulidentata consists of a single species, the aardvark. Tubulidentata are characterised by their teeth which lack a pulp cavity and form thin tubes which are continuously worn down and replaced.

- Family: Orycteropodidae
  - Genus: Orycteropus
    - Aardvark, O. afer LC

==== Order: Hyracoidea (hyraxes) ====
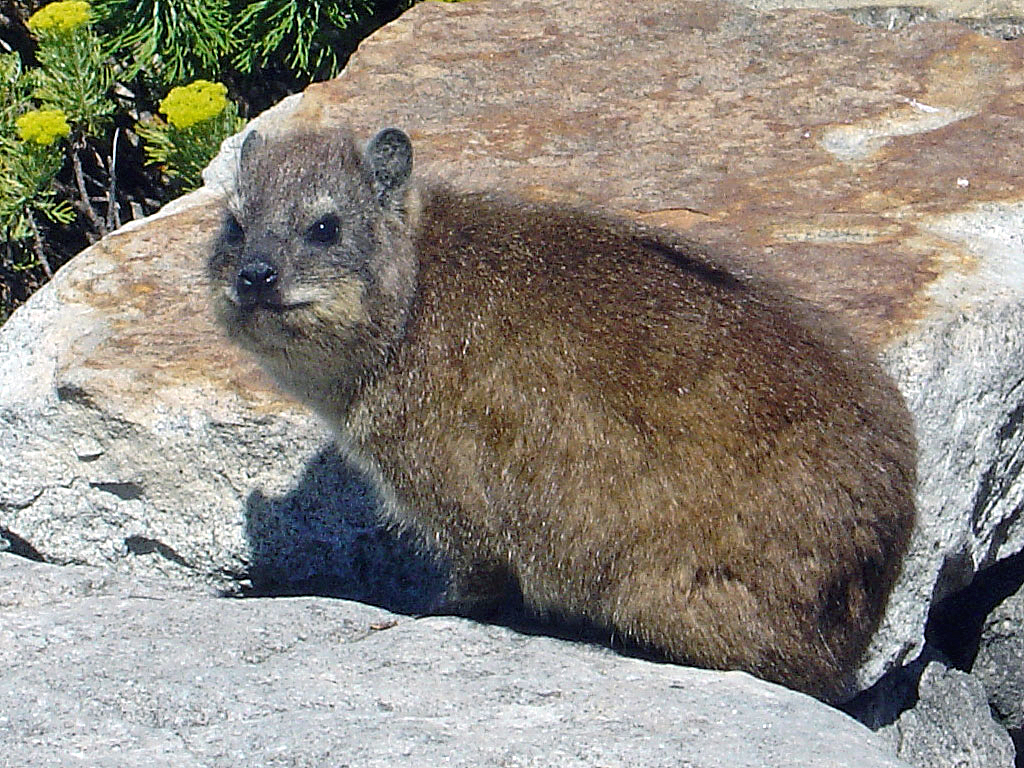
Cape hyrax

The hyraxes are any of four species of fairly small, thickset, herbivorous mammals in the order Hyracoidea. About the size of a domestic cat they are well-furred, with rounded bodies and a stumpy tail. They are native to Africa and the Middle East.

- Family: Procaviidae (hyraxes)
  - Genus: Heterohyrax
    - Yellow-spotted rock hyrax, Heterohyrax brucei LC
  - Genus: Procavia
    - Cape hyrax, Procavia capensis LC

==== Order: Proboscidea (elephants) ====
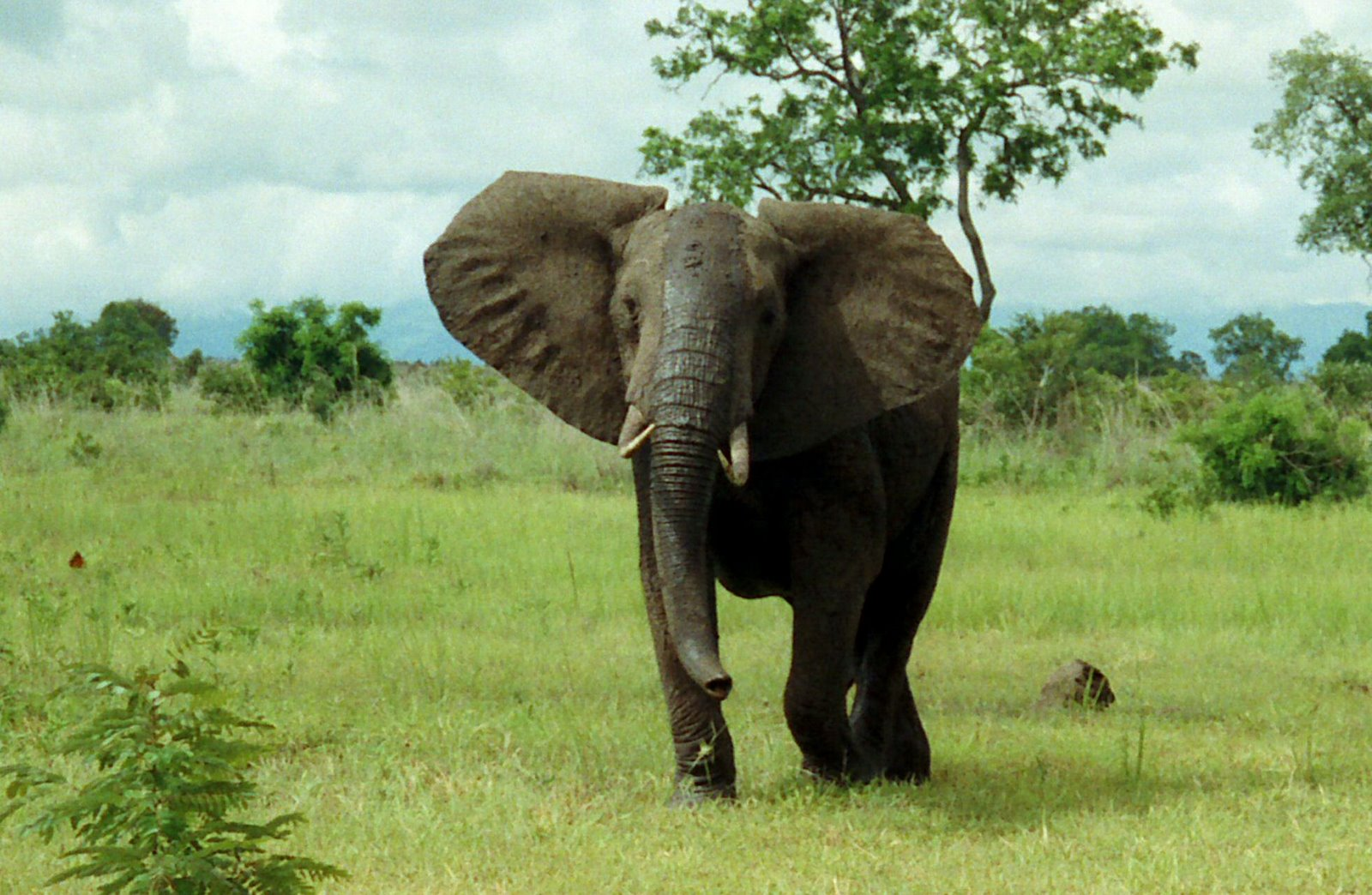
African bush elephant

The elephants comprise three living species and are the largest living land animals.

- Family: Elephantidae (elephants)
  - Genus: Loxodonta
    - African bush elephant, L. africana EN

==== Order: Primates ====
The order Primates contains humans and their closest relatives: lemurs, lorisoids, tarsiers, monkeys, and apes.

- Suborder: Strepsirrhini
  - Infraorder: Lemuriformes
    - Superfamily: Lorisoidea
      - Family: Galagidae
        - Genus: Galago
          - Mohol bushbaby, Galago moholi LR/lc
- Suborder: Haplorhini
  - Infraorder: Simiiformes
    - Parvorder: Catarrhini
      - Superfamily: Cercopithecoidea
        - Family: Cercopithecidae (Old World monkeys)
          - Genus: Chlorocebus
            - Malbrouck, Chlorocebus cynosuros LR/lc
            - Vervet monkey, Chlorocebus pygerythrus LR/lc
          - Genus: Papio
            - Chacma baboon, Papio ursinus LR/lc

==== Order: Rodentia (rodents) ====
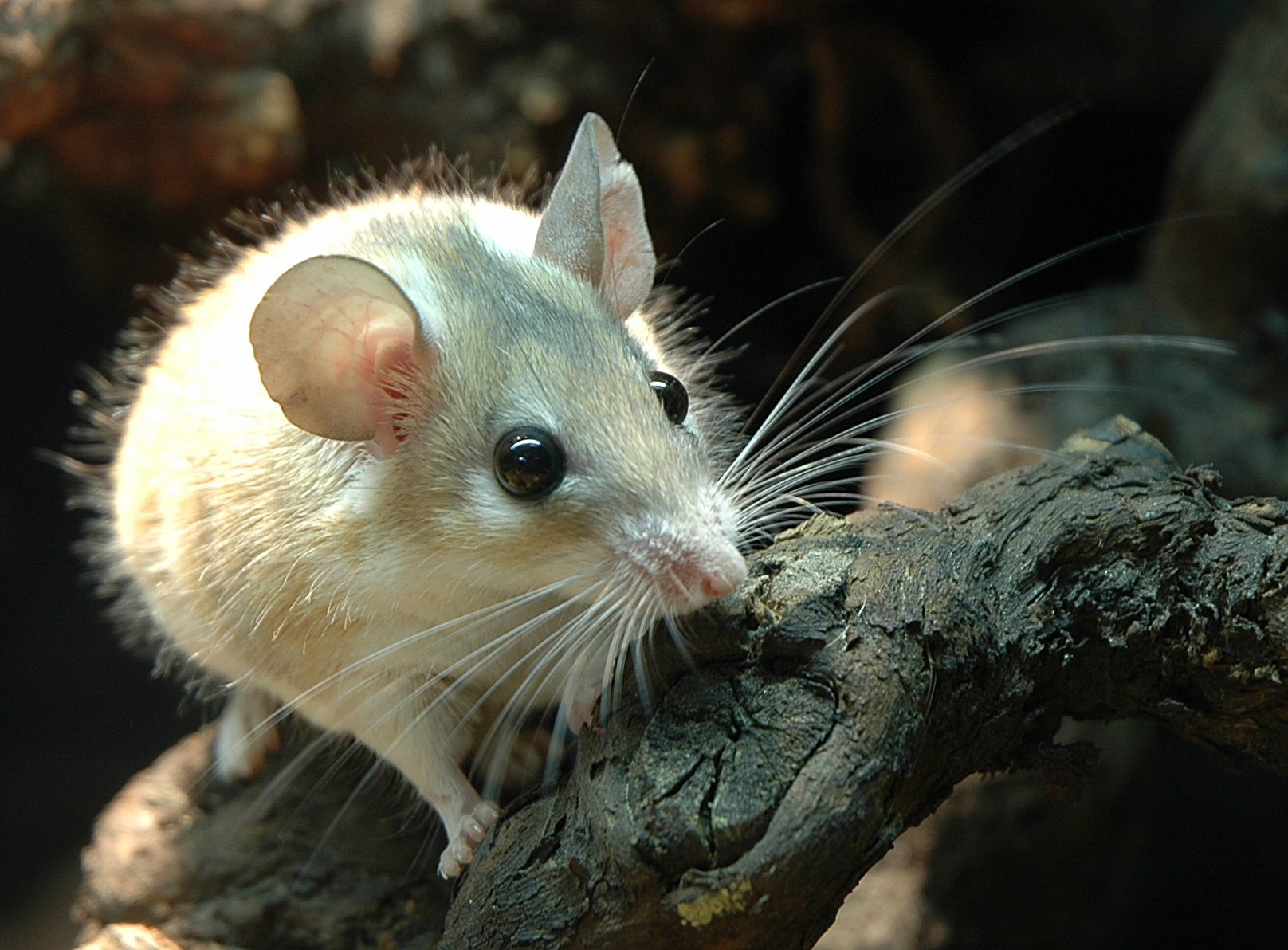
Spiny mouse

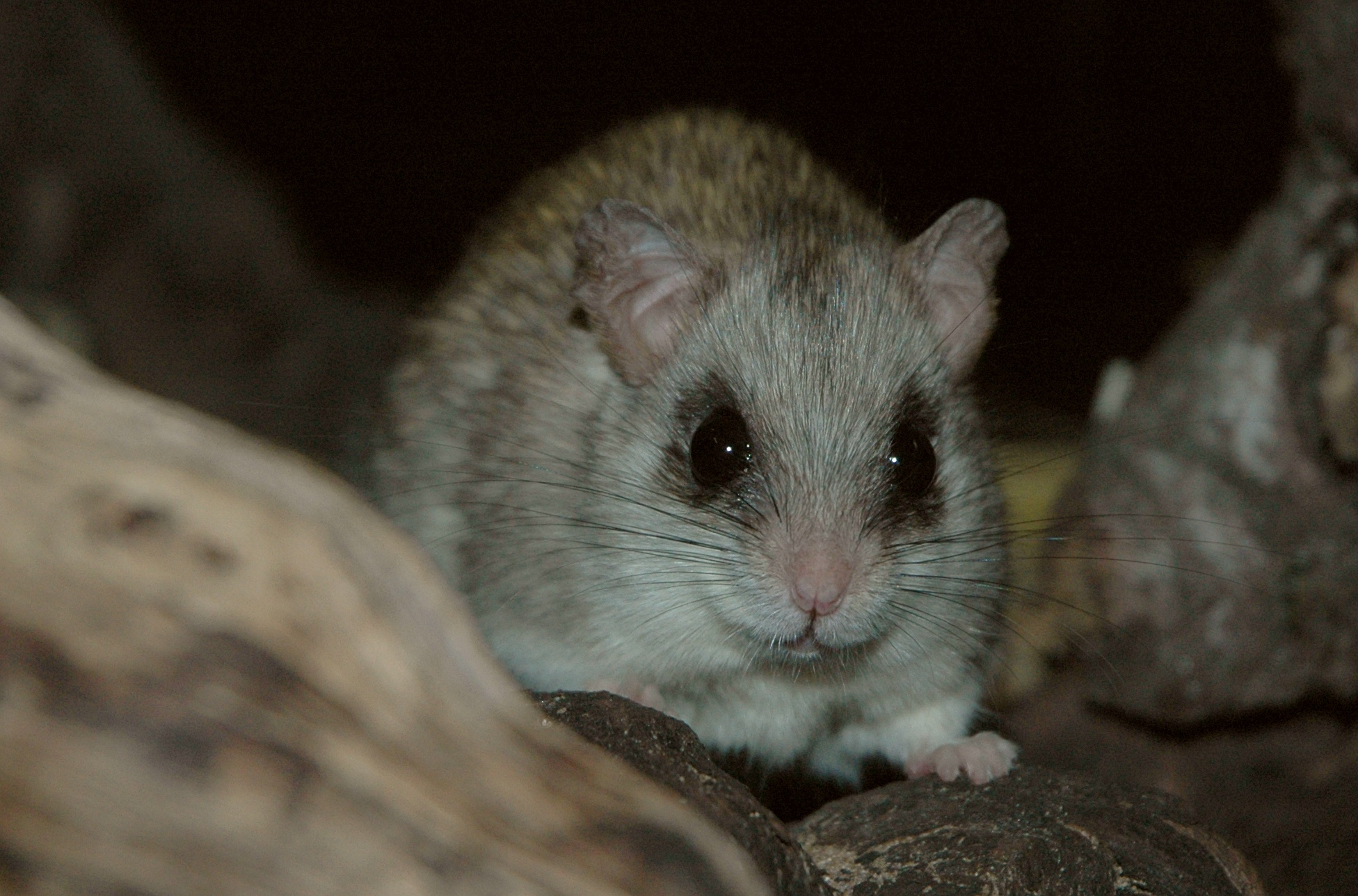
Acacia rat

Rodents make up the largest order of mammals, with over 40% of mammalian species. They have two incisors in the upper and lower jaw which grow continually and must be kept short by gnawing. Most rodents are small though the capybara can weigh up to 45 kg (100 lb).

- Suborder: Hystricomorpha
  - Family: Bathyergidae
    - Genus: Cryptomys
      - Damaraland mole-rat, Fukomys damarensis LC
  - Family: Hystricidae (Old World porcupines)
    - Genus: Hystrix
      - Cape porcupine, Hystrix africaeaustralis LC
  - Family: Thryonomyidae (cane rats)
    - Genus: Thryonomys
      - Greater cane rat, Thryonomys swinderianus LC
- Suborder: Sciurognathi
  - Family: Sciuridae (squirrels)
    - Subfamily: Xerinae
      - Tribe: Xerini
        - Genus: Xerus
          - South African ground squirrel, Xerus inauris LC
      - Tribe: Protoxerini
        - Genus: Paraxerus
          - Smith's bush squirrel, Paraxerus cepapi LC
  - Family: Gliridae (dormice)
    - Subfamily: Graphiurinae
      - Genus: Graphiurus
        - Small-eared dormouse, Graphiurus microtis LC
        - Rock dormouse, Graphiurus platyops LC
  - Family: Nesomyidae
    - Subfamily: Dendromurinae
      - Genus: Dendromus
        - Gray climbing mouse, Dendromus melanotis LC
        - Brants's climbing mouse, Dendromus mesomelas LC
      - Genus: Malacothrix
        - Gerbil mouse, Malacothrix typica LC
      - Genus: Steatomys
        - Kreb's fat mouse, Steatomys krebsii LC
        - Tiny fat mouse, Steatomys parvus LC
        - Fat mouse, Steatomys pratensis LC
    - Subfamily: Cricetomyinae
      - Genus: Cricetomys
        - Southern giant pouched rat, Cricetomys ansorgei LC
      - Genus: Saccostomus
        - South African pouched mouse, Saccostomus campestris LC
  - Family: Muridae (mice, rats, voles, gerbils, hamsters, etc.)
    - Subfamily: Deomyinae
      - Genus: Acomys
        - Spiny mouse, Acomys spinosissimus LC
    - Subfamily: Otomyinae
      - Genus: Otomys
        - Angoni vlei rat, Otomys angoniensis LC
        - Large vlei rat, Otomys maximus LC
      - Genus: Parotomys
        - Brants's whistling rat, Parotomys brantsii LC
    - Subfamily: Gerbillinae
      - Genus: Desmodillus
        - Cape short-eared gerbil, Desmodillus auricularis LC
      - Genus: Gerbillurus
        - Hairy-footed gerbil, Gerbillurus paeba LC
      - Genus: Tatera
        - Highveld gerbil, Tatera brantsii LC
        - Bushveld gerbil, Tatera leucogaster LC
    - Subfamily: Murinae
      - Genus: Aethomys
        - Red rock rat, Aethomys chrysophilus LC
        - Namaqua rock rat, Aethomys namaquensis LC
      - Genus: Dasymys
        - Angolan marsh rat, Dasymys nudipes NT
      - Genus: Lemniscomys
        - Single-striped grass mouse, Lemniscomys rosalia LC
      - Genus: Mastomys
        - Southern multimammate mouse, Mastomys coucha LC
        - Natal multimammate mouse, Mastomys natalensis LC
        - Shortridge's multimammate mouse, Mastomys shortridgei LC
      - Genus: Mus
        - Desert pygmy mouse, Mus indutus LC
        - Setzer's pygmy mouse, Mus setzeri LC
      - Genus: Rhabdomys
        - Four-striped grass mouse, Rhabdomys pumilio LC
      - Genus: Thallomys
        - Black-tailed tree rat, Thallomys nigricauda LC
        - Acacia rat, Thallomys paedulcus LC
      - Genus: Zelotomys
        - Woosnam's broad-headed mouse, Zelotomys woosnami LC

==== Order: Lagomorpha (lagomorphs) ====
The lagomorphs comprise two families, Leporidae (hares and rabbits), and Ochotonidae (pikas). Though they can resemble rodents, and were classified as a superfamily in that order until the early 20th century, they have since been considered a separate order. They differ from rodents in a number of physical characteristics, such as having four incisors in the upper jaw rather than two.

- Family: Leporidae (rabbits, hares)
  - Genus: Pronolagus
    - Jameson's red rock hare, Pronolagus randensis LR/lc
  - Genus: Lepus
    - Cape hare, Lepus capensis LR/lc
    - African savanna hare, Lepus microtis LR/lc

==== Order: Erinaceomorpha (hedgehogs and gymnures) ====
The order Erinaceomorpha contains a single family, Erinaceidae, which comprise the hedgehogs and gymnures. The hedgehogs are easily recognised by their spines while gymnures look more like large rats.

- Family: Erinaceidae (hedgehogs)
  - Subfamily: Erinaceinae
    - Genus: Atelerix
      - Southern African hedgehog, Atelerix frontalis LR/lc

==== Order: Soricomorpha (shrews, moles, and solenodons) ====
The "shrew-forms" are insectivorous mammals. The shrews and solenodons closely resemble mice while the moles are stout-bodied burrowers.

- Family: Soricidae (shrews)
  - Subfamily: Crocidurinae
    - Genus: Crocidura
      - Reddish-gray musk shrew, Crocidura cyanea LC
      - Bicolored musk shrew, Crocidura fuscomurina LC
      - Lesser red musk shrew, Crocidura hirta LC
      - Swamp musk shrew, Crocidura mariquensis LC
      - African giant shrew, Crocidura olivieri LC
    - Genus: Suncus
      - Greater dwarf shrew, Suncus lixus LC
      - Lesser dwarf shrew, Suncus varilla LC

==== Order: Chiroptera (bats) ====
The bats' most distinguishing feature is that their forelimbs are developed as wings, making them the only mammals capable of flight. Bat species account for about 20% of all mammals.

- Family: Pteropodidae (flying foxes, Old World fruit bats)
  - Subfamily: Pteropodinae
    - Genus: Eidolon
      - Straw-coloured fruit bat, Eidolon helvum LC
    - Genus: Epomophorus
      - Peters's epauletted fruit bat, Epomophorus crypturus LC
      - Wahlberg's epauletted fruit bat, Epomophorus wahlbergi LC
- Family: Vespertilionidae
  - Subfamily: Kerivoulinae
    - Genus: Kerivoula
      - Lesser woolly bat, Kerivoula lanosa LC
  - Subfamily: Vespertilioninae
    - Genus: Glauconycteris
      - Butterfly bat, Glauconycteris variegata LC
    - Genus: Laephotis
      - Botswanan long-eared bat, Laephotis botswanae LC
    - Genus: Neoromicia
      - Cape serotine, Neoromicia capensis LC
      - Banana pipistrelle, Neoromicia nanus LC
      - Rendall's serotine, Neoromicia rendalli LC
      - Somali serotine, Neoromicia somalicus LC
      - Zulu serotine, Neoromicia zuluensis LC
    - Genus: Nycticeinops
      - Schlieffen's bat, Nycticeinops schlieffeni LC
    - Genus: Pipistrellus
      - Rüppell's pipistrelle, Pipistrellus rueppelli LC
      - Rusty pipistrelle, Pipistrellus rusticus LC
    - Genus: Scotophilus
      - African yellow bat, Scotophilus dinganii LC
      - White-bellied yellow bat, Scotophilus leucogaster LC
      - Greenish yellow bat, Scotophilus viridis LC
  - Subfamily: Miniopterinae
    - Genus: Miniopterus
      - Natal long-fingered bat, Miniopterus natalensis NT
- Family: Molossidae
  - Genus: Chaerephon
    - Nigerian free-tailed bat, Chaerephon nigeriae LC
    - Little free-tailed bat, Chaerephon pumila LC
    - Chapin's free-tailed bat, Chaerephon shortridgei NT
  - Genus: Mops
    - Angolan free-tailed bat, Mops condylurus LC
    - Midas free-tailed bat, Mops midas LC
  - Genus: Sauromys
    - Roberts's flat-headed bat, Sauromys petrophilus LC
  - Genus: Tadarida
    - Egyptian free-tailed bat, Tadarida aegyptiaca LC
- Family: Emballonuridae
  - Genus: Taphozous
    - Mauritian tomb bat, Taphozous mauritianus LC
    - Egyptian tomb bat, Taphozous perforatus LC
- Family: Nycteridae
  - Genus: Nycteris
    - Hairy slit-faced bat, Nycteris hispida LC
    - Large-eared slit-faced bat, Nycteris macrotis LC
    - Egyptian slit-faced bat, Nycteris thebaica LC
- Family: Rhinolophidae
  - Subfamily: Rhinolophinae
    - Genus: Rhinolophus
      - Blasius's horseshoe bat, R. blasii LC
      - Darling's horseshoe bat, Rhinolophus darlingi LC
      - Dent's horseshoe bat, Rhinolophus denti DD
      - Rüppell's horseshoe bat, Rhinolophus fumigatus LC
      - Hildebrandt's horseshoe bat, Rhinolophus hildebrandti LC
      - Bushveld horseshoe bat, Rhinolophus simulator LC
  - Subfamily: Hipposiderinae
    - Genus: Cloeotis
      - Percival's trident bat, Cloeotis percivali VU
    - Genus: Hipposideros
      - Sundevall's roundleaf bat, Hipposideros caffer LC
      - Commerson's roundleaf bat, Hipposideros marungensis NT

==== Order: Pholidota (pangolins) ====
The order Pholidota comprises the eight species of pangolin. Pangolins are anteaters and have the powerful claws, elongated snout and long tongue seen in the other unrelated anteater species.

- Family: Manidae
  - Genus: Manis
    - Ground pangolin, Manis temminckii LR/nt

==== Order: Carnivora (carnivorans) ====
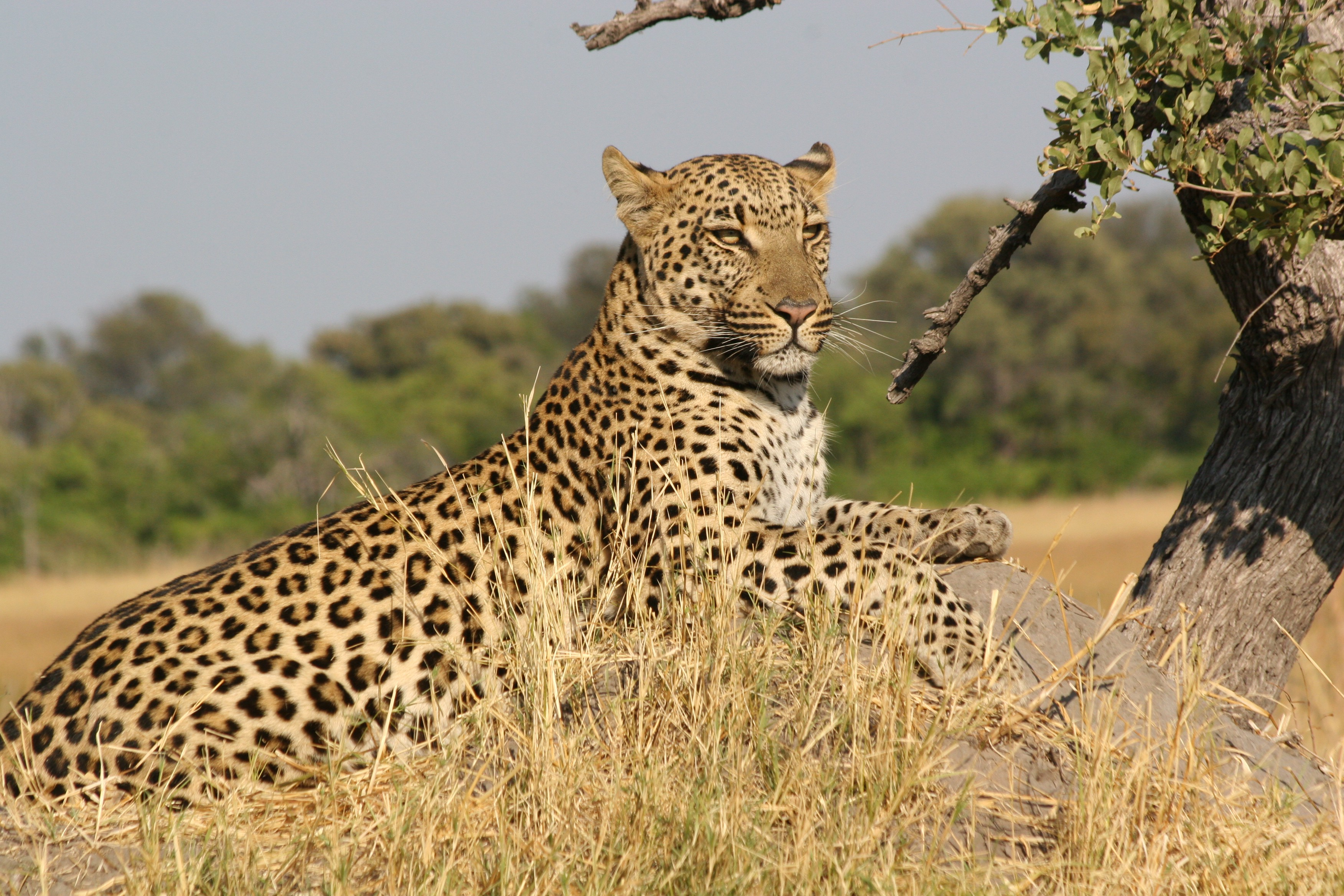
African leopard

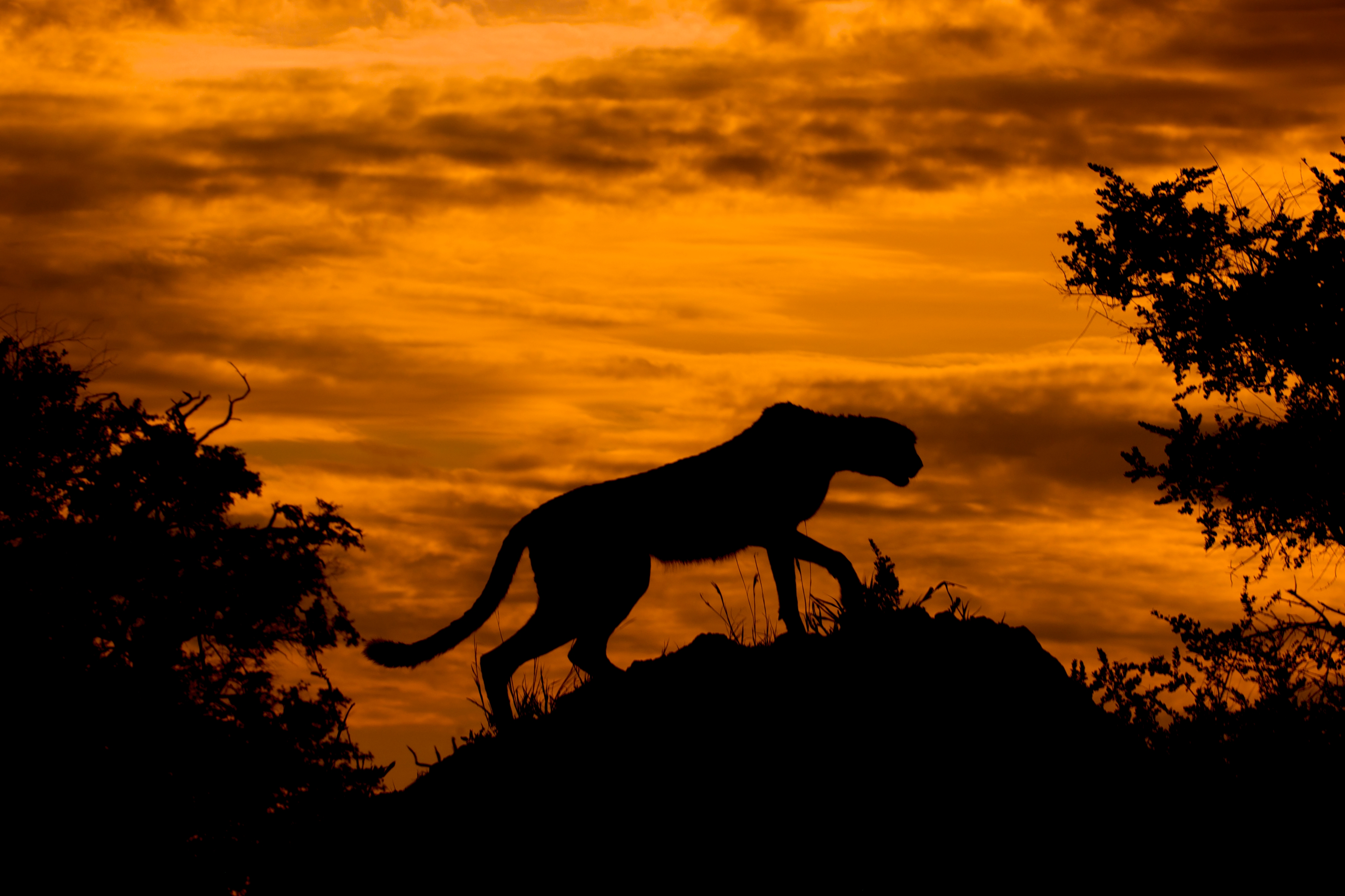
Cheetah

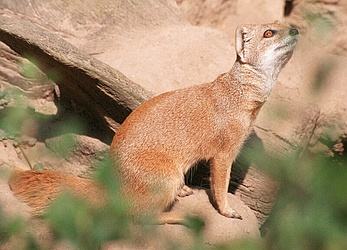
Yellow mongoose

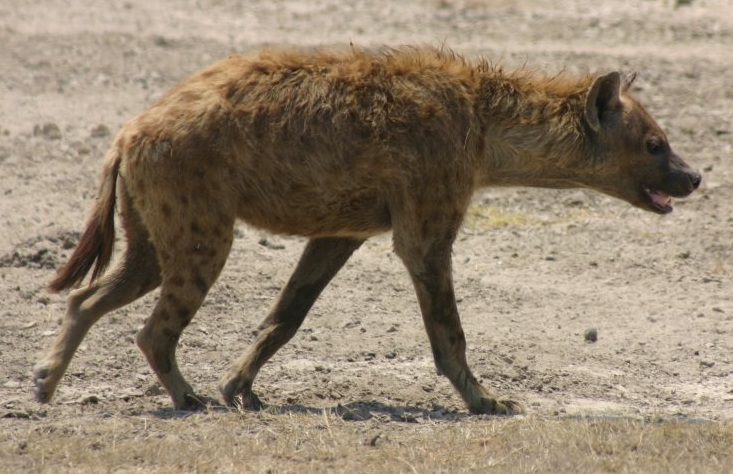
Spotted hyena

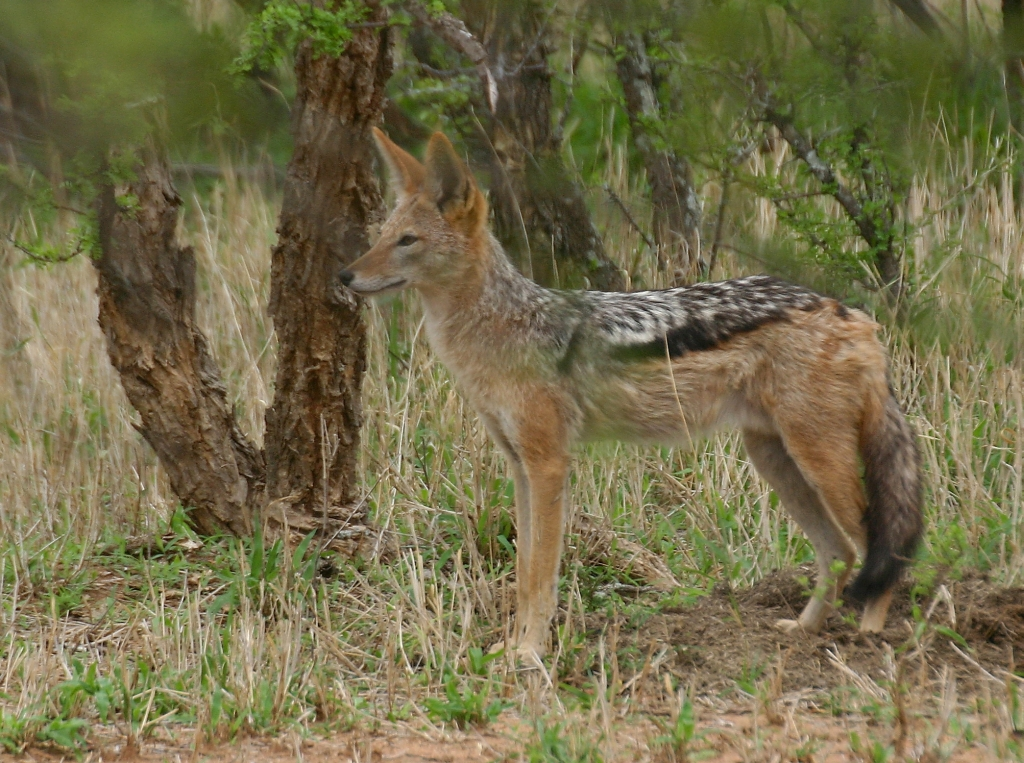
Black-backed jackal

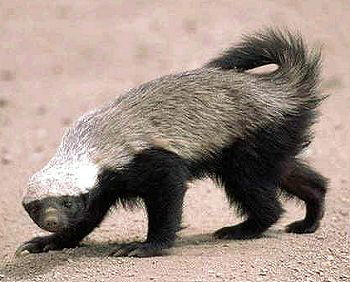
Honey badger

There are over 260 species of carnivorans, the majority of which feed primarily on meat. They have a characteristic skull shape and dentition.

- Suborder: Feliformia
  - Family: Felidae (cats)
    - Subfamily: Felinae
      - Genus: Acinonyx
        - Cheetah, Acinonyx jubatus VU
          - Southeast African cheetah, A. j. jubatus
      - Genus: Caracal
        - Caracal, Caracal caracal LC
      - Genus: Felis
        - Black-footed cat, Felis nigripes VU
        - African wildcat, F. lybica LC
      - Genus: Leptailurus
        - Serval, Leptailurus serval LC
    - Subfamily: Pantherinae
      - Genus: Panthera
        - Lion, Panthera leo VU
          - Panthera leo melanochaita
        - Leopard, Panthera pardus VU
          - African leopard, P. p. pardus
  - Family: Viverridae
    - Subfamily: Viverrinae
      - Genus: Civettictis
        - African civet, Civettictis civetta LC
      - Genus: Genetta
        - Common genet, Genetta genetta LC
        - Rusty-spotted genet, Genetta maculata LC
  - Family: Herpestidae (mongooses)
    - Genus: Atilax
      - Marsh mongoose, Atilax paludinosus LC
    - Genus: Cynictis
      - Yellow mongoose, Cynictis penicillata LC
    - Genus: Helogale
      - Common dwarf mongoose, Helogale parvula LC
    - Genus: Herpestes
      - Egyptian mongoose, Herpestes ichneumon LC
      - Common slender mongoose, Herpestes sanguineus LC
    - Genus: Ichneumia
      - White-tailed mongoose, Ichneumia albicauda LC
    - Genus: Mungos
      - Banded mongoose, Mungos mungo LC
    - Genus: Paracynictis
      - Selous' mongoose, Paracynictis selousi LC
    - Genus: Suricata
      - Meerkat, Suricata suricatta LC
  - Family: Hyaenidae (hyaenas)
    - Genus: Crocuta
      - Spotted hyena, Crocuta crocuta LC
    - Genus: Parahyaena
      - Brown hyena, P. brunnea NT
    - Genus: Proteles
      - Aardwolf, Proteles cristatus LC
- Suborder: Caniformia
  - Family: Canidae (dogs, foxes)
    - Genus: Lupulella
      - Side-striped jackal, L. adusta LC
      - Black-backed jackal, L. mesomelas LC
    - Genus: Vulpes
      - Cape fox, Vulpes chama LC
    - Genus: Otocyon
      - Bat-eared fox, Otocyon megalotis LC
    - Genus: Lycaon
      - African wild dog, Lycaon pictus EN
  - Family: Mustelidae (mustelids)
    - Genus: Ictonyx
      - Striped polecat, Ictonyx striatus LC
    - Genus: Poecilogale
      - African striped weasel, Poecilogale albinucha LC
    - Genus: Mellivora
      - Honey badger, Mellivora capensis LC
    - Genus: Lutra
      - Speckle-throated otter, Lutra maculicollis NT
    - Genus: Aonyx
      - African clawless otter, Aonyx capensis NT

==== Order: Perissodactyla (odd-toed ungulates) ====
The odd-toed ungulates are browsing and grazing mammals. They are usually large to very large, and have relatively simple stomachs and a large middle toe.

- Family: Equidae (horses etc.)
  - Genus: Equus
    - Burchell's zebra, Equus quagga burchellii NT
    - Chapman's zebra, Equus quagga chapmani EN
- Family: Rhinocerotidae
  - Genus: Diceros
    - Southern black rhinoceros, Diceros bicornis bicornis EX
    - Chobe black rhinoceros, Diceros bicornis chobiensis CR
    - South-central black rhinoceros, Diceros bicornis minor CR
  - Genus: Ceratotherium
    - Southern white rhinoceros, Ceratotherium simum simum NT

==== Order: Artiodactyla (even-toed ungulates) ====
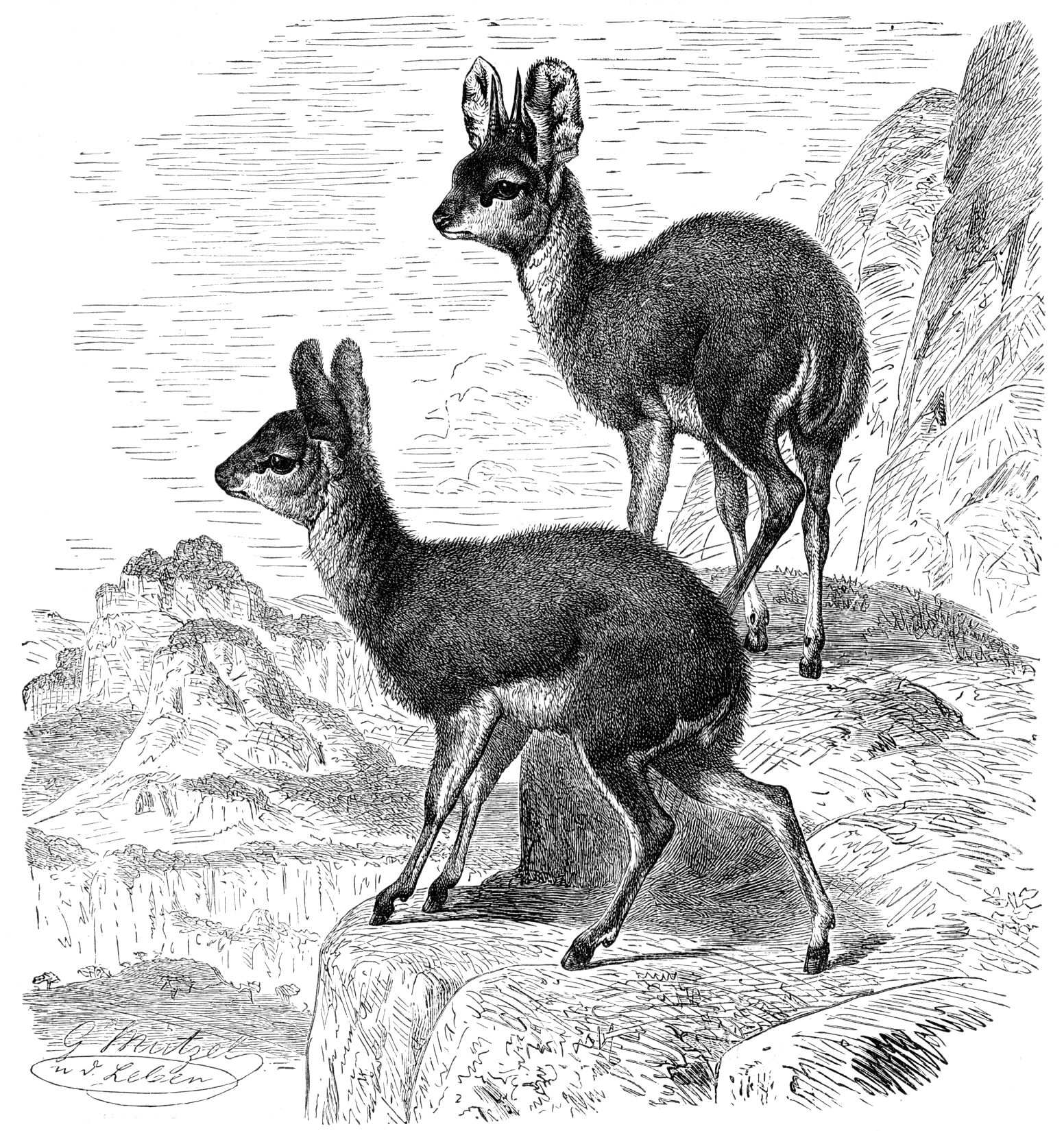
Klipspringer

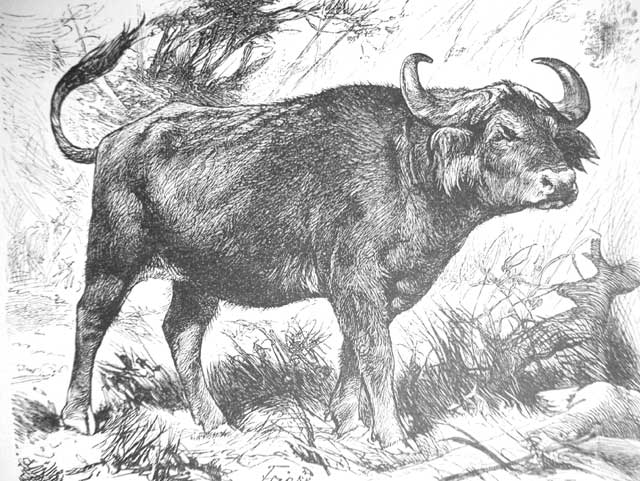
African buffalo

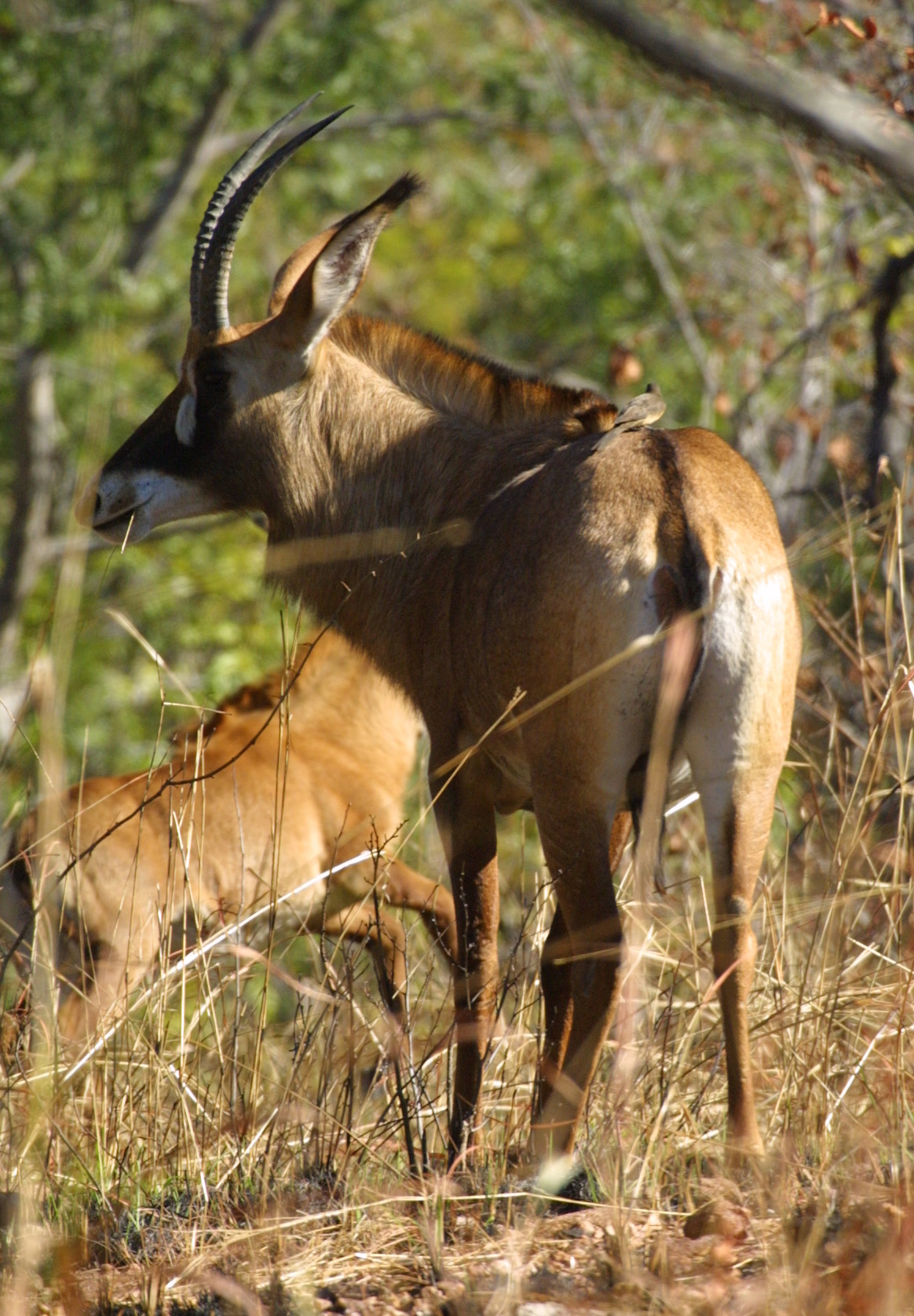
Roan antelope

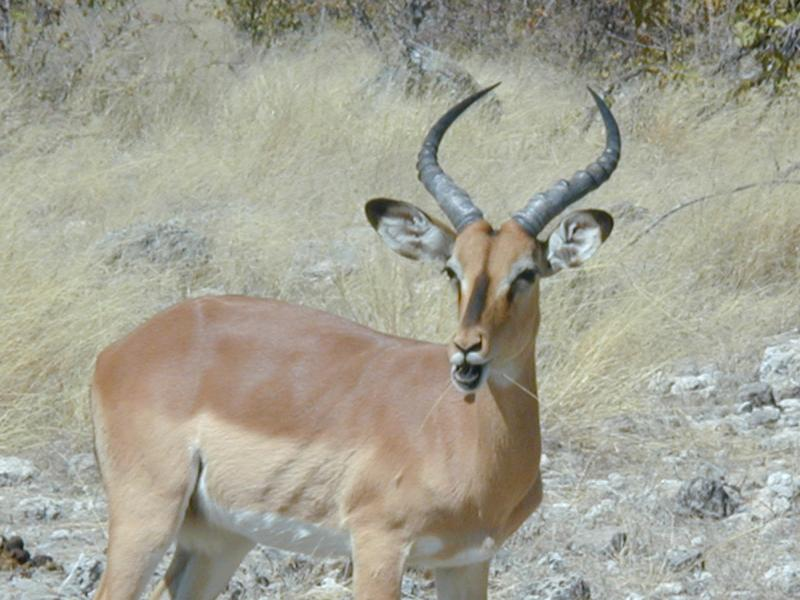
Impala

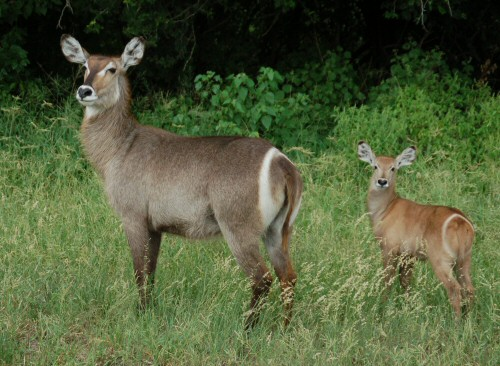
Waterbuck

The even-toed ungulates are ungulates whose weight is borne about equally by the third and fourth toes, rather than mostly or entirely by the third as in perissodactyls. There are about 220 artiodactyl species, including many that are of great economic importance to humans.

- Family: Suidae (pigs)
  - Subfamily: Phacochoerinae
    - Genus: Phacochoerus
      - Common warthog, Phacochoerus africanus LR/lc
  - Subfamily: Suinae
    - Genus: Potamochoerus
      - Bushpig, Potamochoerus larvatus LR/lc
- Family: Hippopotamidae (hippopotamuses)
  - Genus: Hippopotamus
    - Hippopotamus, Hippopotamus amphibius VU
- Family: Giraffidae (giraffe, okapi)
  - Genus: Giraffa
    - Giraffe, Giraffa camelopardalis VU
- Family: Bovidae (cattle, antelope, sheep, goats)
  - Subfamily: Alcelaphinae
    - Genus: Alcelaphus
      - Hartebeest, Alcelaphus buselaphus LR/cd
    - Genus: Connochaetes
      - Blue wildebeest, Connochaetes taurinus LR/cd
    - Genus: Damaliscus
      - Topi, Damaliscus lunatus LR/cd
  - Subfamily: Antilopinae
    - Genus: Antidorcas
      - Springbok antelope, Antidorcas marsupialis LR/cd
    - Genus: Oreotragus
      - Klipspringer, Oreotragus oreotragus LR/cd
    - Genus: Ourebia
      - Oribi, Ourebia ourebi LR/cd
    - Genus: Raphicerus
      - Steenbok, Raphicerus campestris LR/lc
      - Sharpe's grysbok, Raphicerus sharpei LR/cd
  - Subfamily: Bovinae
    - Genus: Syncerus
      - African buffalo, Syncerus caffer LR/cd
    - Genus: Tragelaphus
      - Nyala, T. angasii LC introduced
      - Common eland, Tragelaphus oryx LR/cd
      - Bushbuck, Tragelaphus scriptus LR/lc
      - Sitatunga, Tragelaphus spekii LR/nt
      - Greater kudu, Tragelaphus strepsiceros LR/cd
  - Subfamily: Cephalophinae
    - Genus: Sylvicapra
      - Common duiker, Sylvicapra grimmia LR/lc
  - Subfamily: Hippotraginae
    - Genus: Hippotragus
      - Roan antelope, Hippotragus equinus LR/cd
      - Sable antelope, Hippotragus niger LR/cd
    - Genus: Oryx
      - Gemsbok, Oryx gazella LR/cd
  - Subfamily: Peleinae
    - Genus: Pelea
      - Grey rhebok, Pelea capreolus LC
  - Subfamily: Aepycerotinae
    - Genus: Aepyceros
      - Impala, Aepyceros melampus LR/cd
  - Subfamily: Reduncinae
    - Genus: Kobus
      - Waterbuck, Kobus ellipsiprymnus LR/cd
      - Lechwe, Kobus leche LR/cd
      - Puku, Kobus vardonii LR/cd
    - Genus: Redunca
      - Southern reedbuck, Redunca arundinum LR/cd
      - Mountain reedbuck, Redunca fulvorufula LC

== See also ==
- List of chordate orders
- Lists of mammals by region
- List of mammals described in the 2000s
