= Northwestern fat mouse =

Conservation status
- Least Concern (IUCN 3.1)

Scientific classification
- Kingdom: Animalia
- Phylum: Chordata
- Class: Mammalia
- Order: Rodentia
- Family: Nesomyidae
- Genus: Steatomys
- Species: S. caurinus

Binomial name
- Steatomys caurinus Thomas, 1912

Species of rodent

The northwestern fat mouse (Steatomys caurinus) is a species of rodent in the family Nesomyidae. It is native to tropical West Africa where it occurs on grassland and crop land.

== Taxonomy ==
The northwestern fat mouse was first described as Steatomys caurinus by the British zoologist Oldfield Thomas in 1912. Coatzee considered it, in 1977, to be a subspecies of the fat mouse (Steatomys pratensis), but Swanepoel and Schlitter elevated it to full species rank in 1978.

== Description ==
The northwestern fat mouse has a head-and-body length of between 96 and 122 mm (3.8 and 4.8 in) and a tail length of between 35 and 50 mm (1.4 and 2.0 in). It weighs between 36 and 60 g (1.27 and 2.12 oz). It is a dark reddish-brown colour and always has ten or more nipples. It is one of three species of fat mouse occurring in West Africa. It can be distinguished from the dainty fat mouse (Steatomys caurinus) by being larger and darker, by having a shorter tail and by having more nipples. The third species, Jackson's fat mouse (Steatomys jacksoni), does not share the same range, being found only in southern Ghana and southern Nigeria.

== Distribution and habitat ==
It is found in Benin, southern Burkina Faso, Ivory Coast, northern Ghana, southwestern Mali, Niger, northern Nigeria, Senegal, and Togo, where its natural habitat is subtropical or tropical dry shrubland and agricultural land.

== Status ==
The northwestern fat mouse is a somewhat uncommon species showing considerable population swings. It has a wide range and a presumed large total population, and is present in several protected areas, so the International Union for Conservation of Nature has assessed its conservation status as "least concern".
