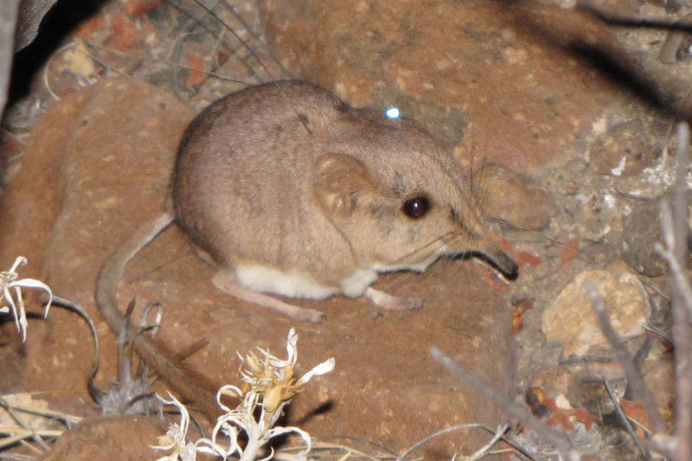

Conservation status
- Least Concern (IUCN 3.1)

Scientific classification
- Kingdom: Animalia
- Phylum: Chordata
- Class: Mammalia
- Infraclass: Placentalia
- Order: Macroscelidea
- Family: Macroscelididae
- Genus: Macroscelides
- Species: M. micus

Binomial name
- Macroscelides micus Dumbacher & Rathbun, 2014
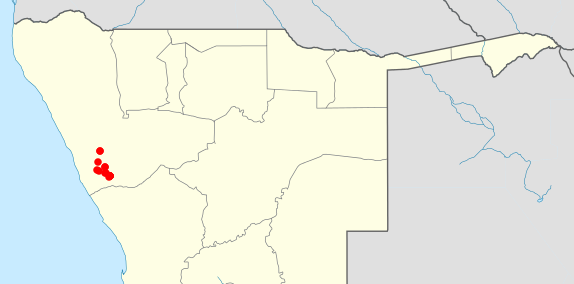
- ● specimen localities

= Macroscelides micus =

Species of shrew

Macroscelides micus, the Etendeka round-eared sengi or Etendeka round-eared elephant shrew, is a species of small mammal belonging to the sengi family (Macroscelididae). It is only found in gravel plains in the Etendeka formation of north-west Namibia. Measuring about 7.3 inches (19 cm) long and weighing less than an ounce (28 grams), the species is the smallest in the sengi family.

== Description ==
Macroscelides micus is the smallest known sengi. Its body shape resembles that of a long-nosed mouse. However, as a member of the superorder Afrotheria, it is actually more closely related to elephants and manatees than mice. It has pink skin and red fur which helps it camouflage itself against the volcanic rocks of its environment. It weighs less than one ounce (28 grams) and is 7.3 inches (19 cm) long, including the tail, when fully grown. M. micus has long, thin legs relative to its body.

Macroscelides micus does not burrow, instead sleeping in bushes. It uses its long nose to hunt for ground insects. Some sengi species are known to be monogamous and mate for life. It is unknown if this is the case for M. micus. The young of M. micus, which are often born as twins, are capable of running from birth.

== Discovery and identification ==
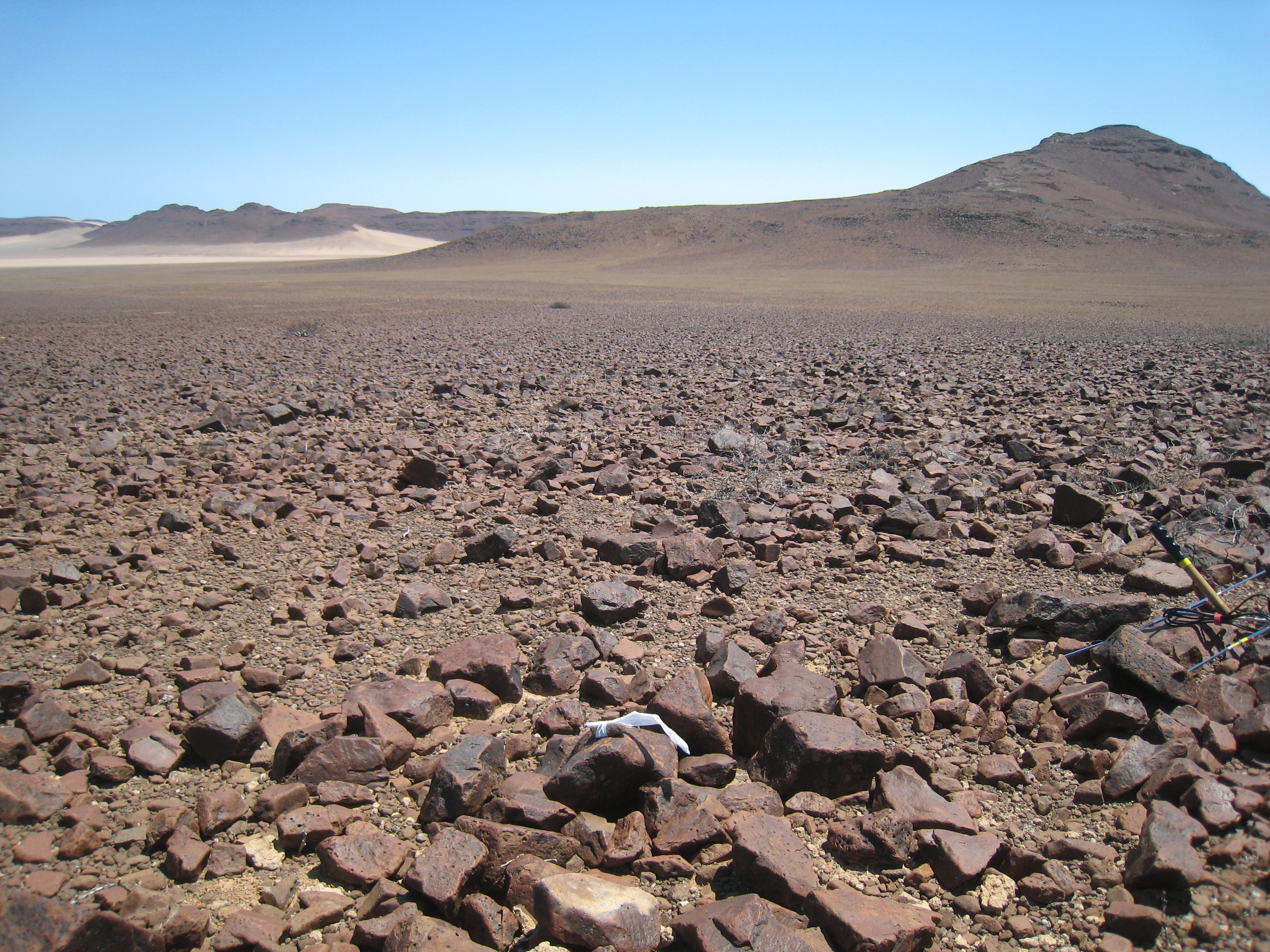
M. micus habitat in Namibia: white flagging marks an individual day-shelter

Macroscelides micus was first spotted as an unusual sample (collected in 2006) among a collection of sengis stored at the California Academy of Sciences, its red fur distinguishing it from other specimens. Genetic testing suggested it was a distinct species, but additional evidence was needed to confirm the finding. Dumbacher et al. traveled to the Namib Desert nine times over a number of years where they set traps baited with peanut butter, oats, and Marmite. A total of 21 sengi specimens were obtained, 15 of which belonged to the new species.

In 2014, Dumbacher et al. formally described M. micus as a new species. The specific name comes from the Greek mikros, meaning small. The "Etendeka" in the common name is the native word for the mountain range where M. micus lives. The scientific team speculated the species had not previously been identified because it has a small range in a remote area that is hard to reach.

== Related species ==
Macroscelides micus is sympatric with Macroscelides flavicaudatus, but remains physically and genetically distinguishable from it. The study which first identified M. micus did not find evidence of gene flow or interbreeding between the populations. Additionally, the species live in different habitats. M. micus is found among the gravel at the bases of hills and mountains in low-lying areas of the Etendeka geological formation; M. flavicaudatus is found among sedimentary deposits in the Awahab Outliers and river valleys.

Macroscelides micus does not overlap Macroscelides proboscideus geographically. A maximum likelihood analysis of four genes by computational phylogenetics indicated that M. proboscideus and M. flavicaudatus are sister species, with M. micus being less closely related.

The authors also explained several limitations and confusions involving an enigmatic report of Macroscelides melanotis (Ogleby 1838), whose type specimen was not available for destructive DNA testing and had an "unnatural" appearance. Recommending M. melanotis be treated as a nomen dubium, they expressed doubt that the described characteristics were consistent with M. micus: "The reported pale, reddish brown chest color is not visible on the specimen, nor is the dunnish white abdomen or throat."
