= Dainty fat mouse =

Conservation status
- Least Concern (IUCN 3.1)

Scientific classification
- Kingdom: Animalia
- Phylum: Chordata
- Class: Mammalia
- Order: Rodentia
- Family: Nesomyidae
- Genus: Steatomys
- Species: S. cuppedius

Binomial name
- Steatomys cuppedius Thomas & Hinton, 1920

Species of rodent

The dainty fat mouse (Steatomys cuppedius) is a species of rodent in the family Nesomyidae. It is found in Benin, Burkina Faso, Mali, Niger, Nigeria, and Senegal. Its natural habitat is subtropical or tropical dry shrubland.

== Description ==
The dainty fat mouse has a head-and-body length of between 78 and 93 mm (3.1 and 3.7 in) and a tail length of between 41 and 50 mm (1.6 and 2.0 in). It weighs between 14 and 24 g (0.49 and 0.85 oz). It is a light sandy-brown colour and always has eight nipples. It is one of three species of fat mouse occurring in West Africa. It can be distinguished from the northwestern fat mouse (Steatomys caurinus) by being smaller and paler, by having a relatively longer tail, which is always at least half the head-and-body length, and by having fewer nipples. The third species, Jackson's fat mouse (Steatomys jacksoni), does not share the same range, being found only in southern Ghana and southern Nigeria, and has twelve nipples.

== Distribution and habitat ==
The dainty fat mouse is native to tropical West Africa. Its range extends from Senegal through southern Mali, Burkina Faso, southern Niger, northern Benin and northwestern Nigeria, at altitudes of between 200 and 600 m (700 and 2,000 ft) above sea level. Its typical habitat is somewhat shrubby grassland.

== Status ==
The dainty fat mouse is a somewhat uncommon species showing considerable population swings. It has a wide range and a presumed large total population, and is present in several protected areas. It is caught and eaten for food in some parts of its range but this is not thought to have a significant impact, so the International Union for Conservation of Nature has assessed its conservation status as "least concern".
