= Awash multimammate mouse =

Conservation status
- Least Concern (IUCN 3.1)

Scientific classification
- Kingdom: Animalia
- Phylum: Chordata
- Class: Mammalia
- Order: Rodentia
- Family: Muridae
- Genus: Mastomys
- Species: M. awashensis

Binomial name
- Mastomys awashensis Lavrenchenko, Likhnova & Baskevich, 1998

Species of rodent

The Awash multimammate mouse or Awash mastomys (Mastomys awashensis) is a species of rodent in the family Muridae found only in Ethiopia. Phylogentically the Awash multimammate mouse is the sister taxon of the Natal multimammate mouse (M. natalensis), a species found almost everywhere in Sub-Saharan Africa and considered a serious agricultural pest throughout its range.

== Habitat ==
Its natural habitats are dry savanna and arable land. It is threatened by habitat loss. It is also considered as a pest for grain crops.

== Ecology ==
The species' ecology has been studied in detail in the croplands of the Degua Tembien district in Tigray, where it commonly occurs in crop fields, domestic and peri-domestic habitats in wider altitudinal range (1500 m up to 2700 m). Being a nocturnal and burrowing species, it prefers crop fields with vertisols. Likewise, the multimammate mouse possibly contributes to a significant portion to the rodent diet of night-active raptors such as Barn owl.
