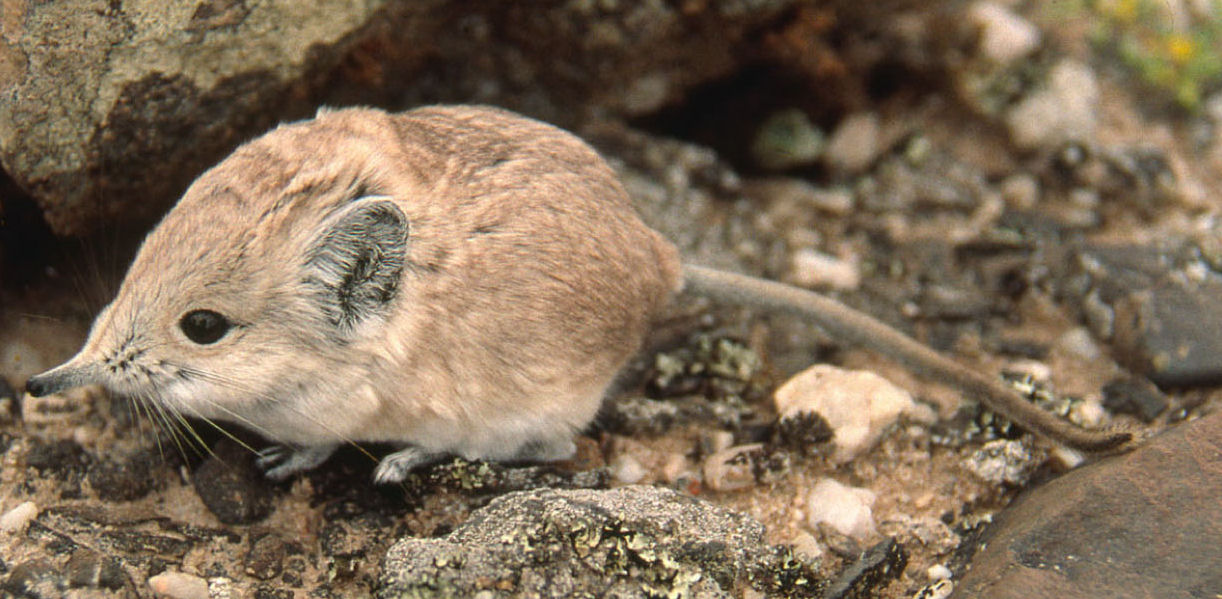

Conservation status
- Least Concern (IUCN 3.1)

Scientific classification
- Kingdom: Animalia
- Phylum: Chordata
- Class: Mammalia
- Infraclass: Placentalia
- Order: Macroscelidea
- Family: Macroscelididae
- Genus: Macroscelides
- Species: M. flavicaudatus

Binomial name
- Macroscelides flavicaudatus Lundholm, 1955
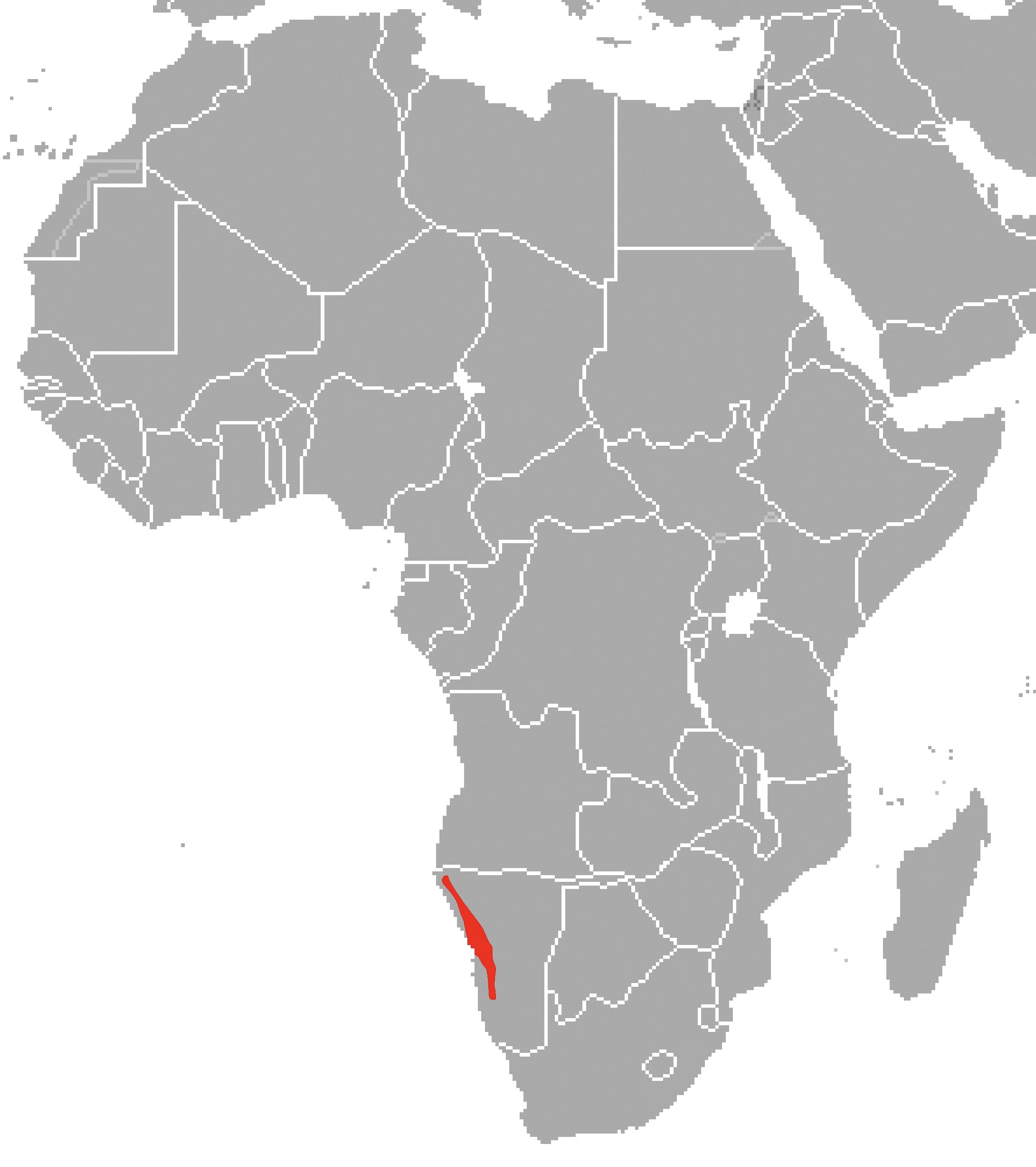

= Macroscelides flavicaudatus =

Species of mammal

Macroscelides flavicaudatus, the Namib round-eared sengi or Namib round-eared elephant shrew, is a species of small mammal belonging to the sengi family (Macroscelididae). It is found in the central Namib desert and southern Namibia.

== Discovery and identification ==
Macroscelides flavicaudatus was first described by Lundholm as Macroscelides proboscideus flavicaudatus, a subspecies of M. proboscideus. The type specimen had been collected by the Plague Research Laboratory of the South African Institute for Medical Research, "six miles from the mouth of the Omaruru River" in Namibia. It is distinguished by the lighter coloration of its fur. Nine other subspecies of M. proboscideus had previously been described; while Corbet and Hanks dismissed the variation between these as continuous, they retained M. p. flavicaudatus.

Upon genetic and morphological analysis, Dumbacher et al. found that the two subspecies were significantly divergent, and proposed elevating both to the rank of species.
