= Angolan multimammate mouse =

Conservation status
- Least Concern (IUCN 3.1)

Scientific classification
- Kingdom: Animalia
- Phylum: Chordata
- Class: Mammalia
- Order: Rodentia
- Family: Muridae
- Genus: Mastomys
- Species: M. angolensis

Binomial name
- Mastomys angolensis (Bocage, 1890)

Synonyms
- Myomyscus angolensis (Bocage, 1890)

Species of rodent

The Angolan multimammate mouse (Mastomys angolensis) is a species of rodent in the family Muridae. It is found in Angola and Democratic Republic of the Congo. It was formerly classified in the genus Myomyscus but has been reclassified into the genus Mastomys. Its natural habitats are dry savanna and moist savanna.
