= Verheyen's multimammate mouse =

Conservation status
- Least Concern (IUCN 3.1)

Scientific classification
- Kingdom: Animalia
- Phylum: Chordata
- Class: Mammalia
- Order: Rodentia
- Family: Muridae
- Genus: Mastomys
- Species: M. kollmannspergeri

Binomial name
- Mastomys kollmannspergeri (Petter, 1957)

Synonyms
- Mastomys verheyeni Robbins & Van der Straeten, 1989

Species of rodent

Verheyen's multimammate mouse (Mastomys kollmannspergeri) is a species of rodent in the family Muridae found in Cameroon, Chad, Niger, Nigeria, and Sudan. Its natural habitats are dry savanna, intermittent rivers, intermittent freshwater lakes, and urban areas.
