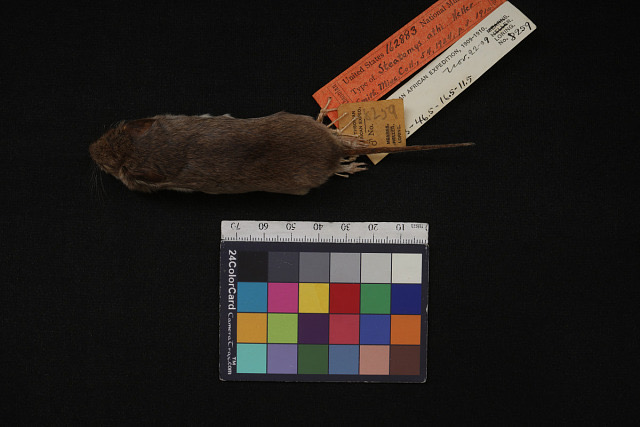

Conservation status
- Least Concern (IUCN 3.1)

Scientific classification
- Kingdom: Animalia
- Phylum: Chordata
- Class: Mammalia
- Order: Rodentia
- Family: Nesomyidae
- Genus: Steatomys
- Species: S. parvus

Binomial name
- Steatomys parvus Rhoads, 1896

= Tiny fat mouse =

Species of rodent

The tiny fat mouse (Steatomys parvus) is a species of rodent in the family Nesomyidae. It is found in Angola, Botswana, Ethiopia, Kenya, Mozambique, Namibia, South Sudan, Tanzania, Uganda, Zambia, and Zimbabwe. Its natural habitats are subtropical or tropical dry shrubland and subtropical or tropical dry lowland grassland.

It favours sandy and cultivated areas, rocky hills, open woodland and grassy plains. The depth of its burrow varies between a minimum of 40 cm and one metre; the burrow contains few passageways, with a central chamber filled with fibers and grass.

== Ecology ==
The tiny fat mouse is part of an assemblage of small mammals in open Acacia woodland. The most abundant rodent in this habitat is the African grass rat (Arvicanthis niloticus), followed by the Natal multimammate mouse (Mastomys natalensis). The shrews Crocidura spp. were also abundant as were the fat mice (Steatomys spp.), Gerbils (Gerbilliscus spp.), tree mice (Dendromus spp.), pouched rats (Saccostomus spp.) and mice in the subgenus Nannomys.

In Terminalia woodland, characterised by the trees Terminalia mollis and Combretum molle and various shrubs, a different community of small mammals is found. Here the Natal multimammate mouse is the most common species, with the tiny fat mouse, Kaiser's rock rat (Aethomys kaiseri) and the Barbary striped grass mouse (Lemniscomys barbarus) also plentiful.

== Status ==
The tiny fat mouse has a very wide range across much of Central and southern Africa. The population is presumed to be large and appears to be stable. For these reasons, the International Union for Conservation of Nature has rated the conservation status of this mouse as being of "least concern".
