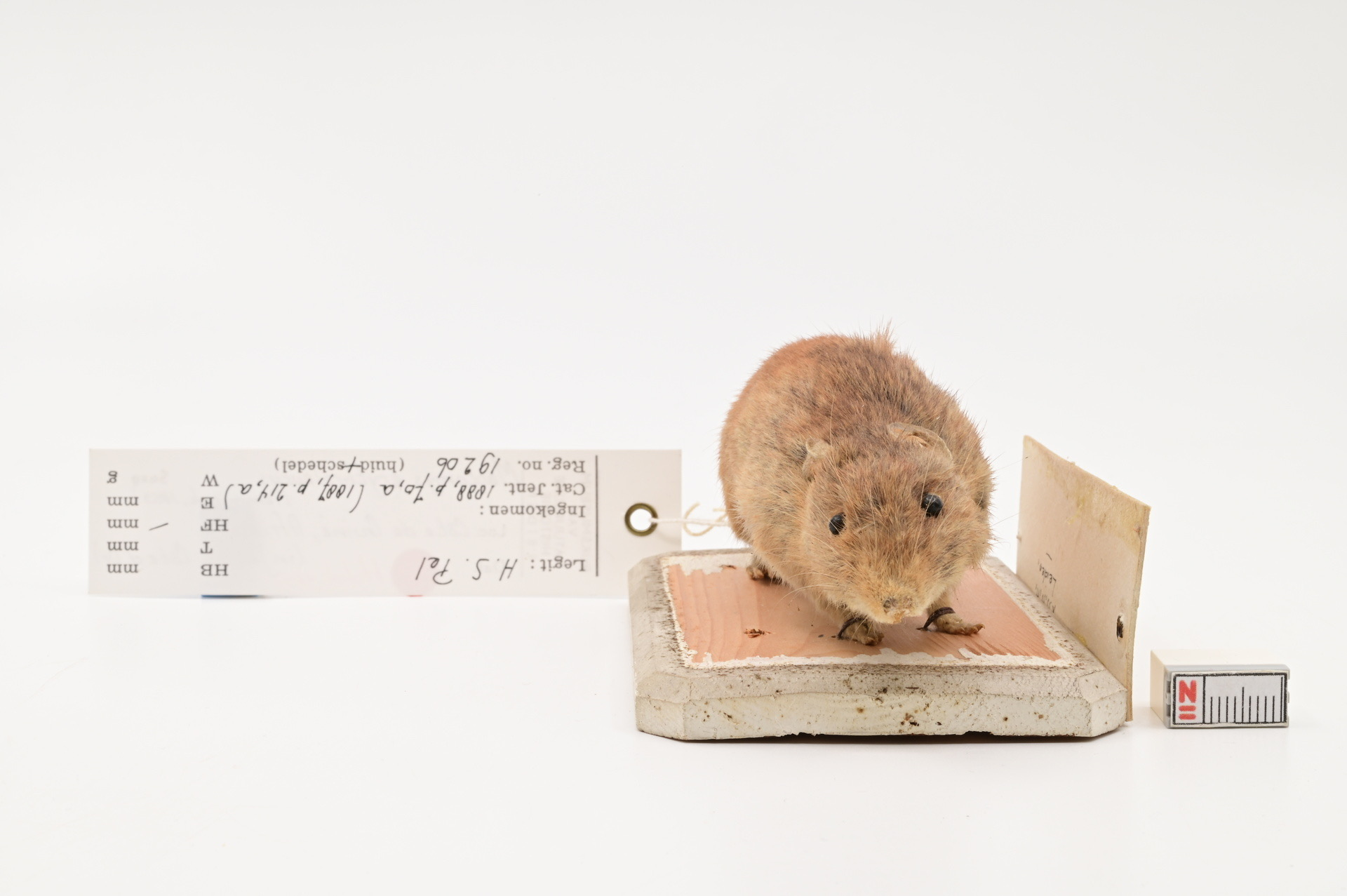

Conservation status
- Least Concern (IUCN 3.1)

Scientific classification
- Kingdom: Animalia
- Phylum: Chordata
- Class: Mammalia
- Order: Rodentia
- Family: Muridae
- Genus: Mastomys
- Species: M. erythroleucus

Binomial name
- Mastomys erythroleucus (Temminck, 1853)

= Guinea multimammate mouse =

Species of rodent

The Guinea multimammate mouse (Mastomys erythroleucus) is a species of rodent in the family Muridae found in Benin, Burkina Faso, Burundi, Cameroon, the Central African Republic, Chad, the Republic of the Congo, the Democratic Republic of the Congo, Ivory Coast, Ethiopia, Gambia, Ghana, Guinea, Guinea-Bissau, Kenya, Liberia, Mali, Mauritania, Morocco, Niger, Nigeria, Rwanda, Senegal, Sierra Leone, Sudan, Togo, and Uganda. Its natural habitats are subtropical or tropical dry forests, dry savanna, moist savanna, subtropical or tropical dry shrubland, subtropical or tropical moist shrubland, arable land, rural gardens, urban areas, and irrigated land. They weigh between 12 and 105 grams.
