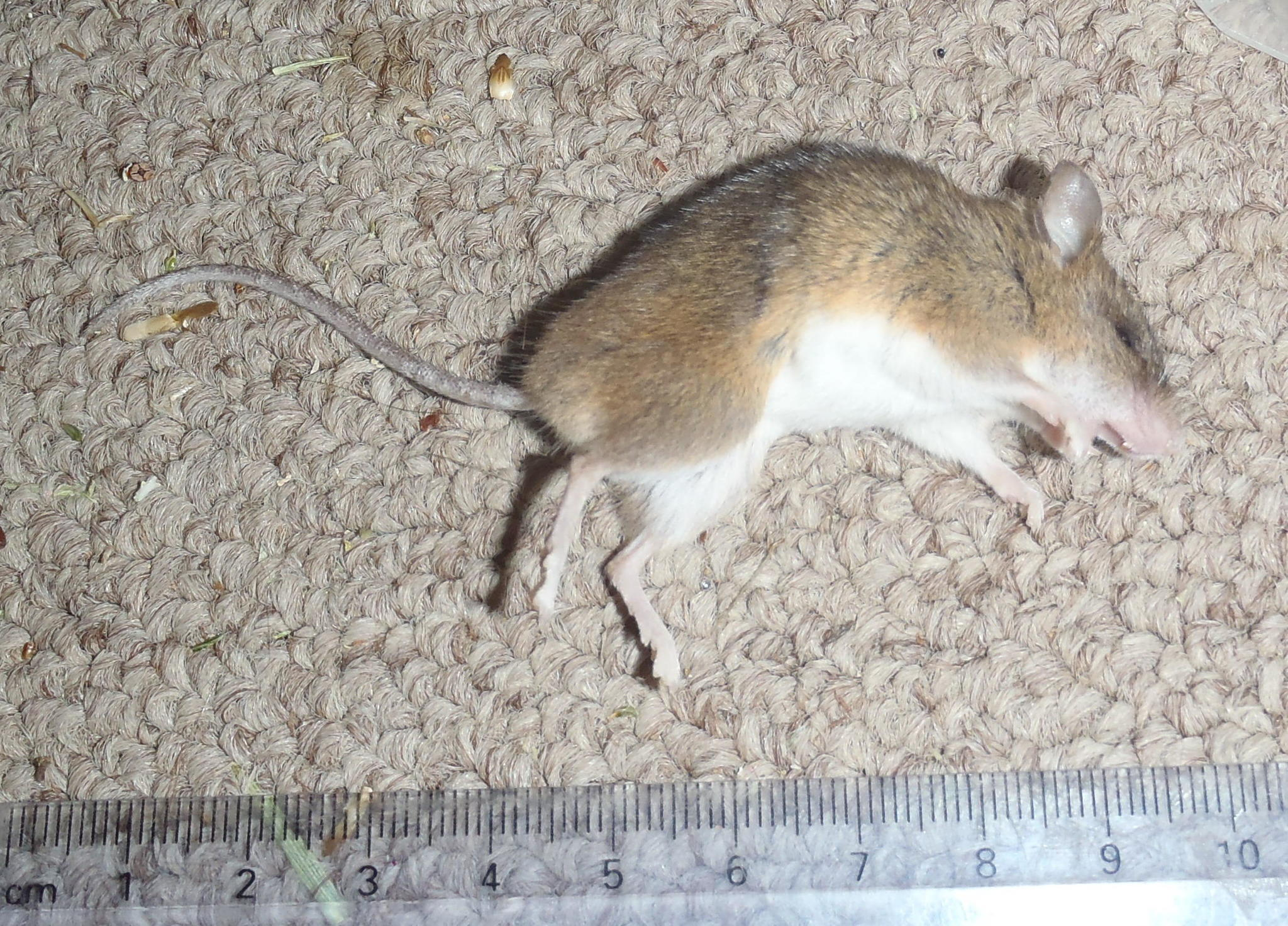
- Steatomys krebsii

Scientific classification
- Kingdom: Animalia
- Phylum: Chordata
- Class: Mammalia
- Order: Rodentia
- Family: Nesomyidae
- Subfamily: Dendromurinae
- Genus: Steatomys; Peters, 1846

Species
- Steatomys bocagei Steatomys caurinus Steatomys cuppedius Steatomys jacksoni Steatomys krebsii Steatomys opimus Steatomys parvus Steatomys pratensis

= Fat mice =

Fat mice Temporal range: Late Pliocene - Recent

Genus of rodents

Fat mice are members of the genus Steatomys, rodents in the family Nesomyidae. It contains the following species:

- Bocage's African fat mouse (Steatomys bocagei)
- Northwestern fat mouse (Steatomys caurinus)
- Dainty fat mouse (Steatomys cuppedius)
- Jackson's fat mouse (Steatomys jacksoni)
- Krebs's fat mouse (Steatomys krebsii)
- Pousargues African fat mouse (Steatomys opimus)
- Tiny fat mouse (Steatomys parvus)
- Fat mouse (Steatomys pratensis)
