= Shortridge's multimammate mouse =

Conservation status
- Least Concern (IUCN 3.1)

Scientific classification
- Kingdom: Animalia
- Phylum: Chordata
- Class: Mammalia
- Order: Rodentia
- Family: Muridae
- Genus: Mastomys
- Species: M. shortridgei

Binomial name
- Mastomys shortridgei (St. Leger, 1933)

Species of rodent

Shortridge's multimammate mouse (Mastomys shortridgei) is a rodent species in the family Muridae. It is native to Angola, Botswana and Namibia. Its natural habitats are moist savanna, subtropical or tropical seasonally wet or flooded lowland grassland, and swamps.
