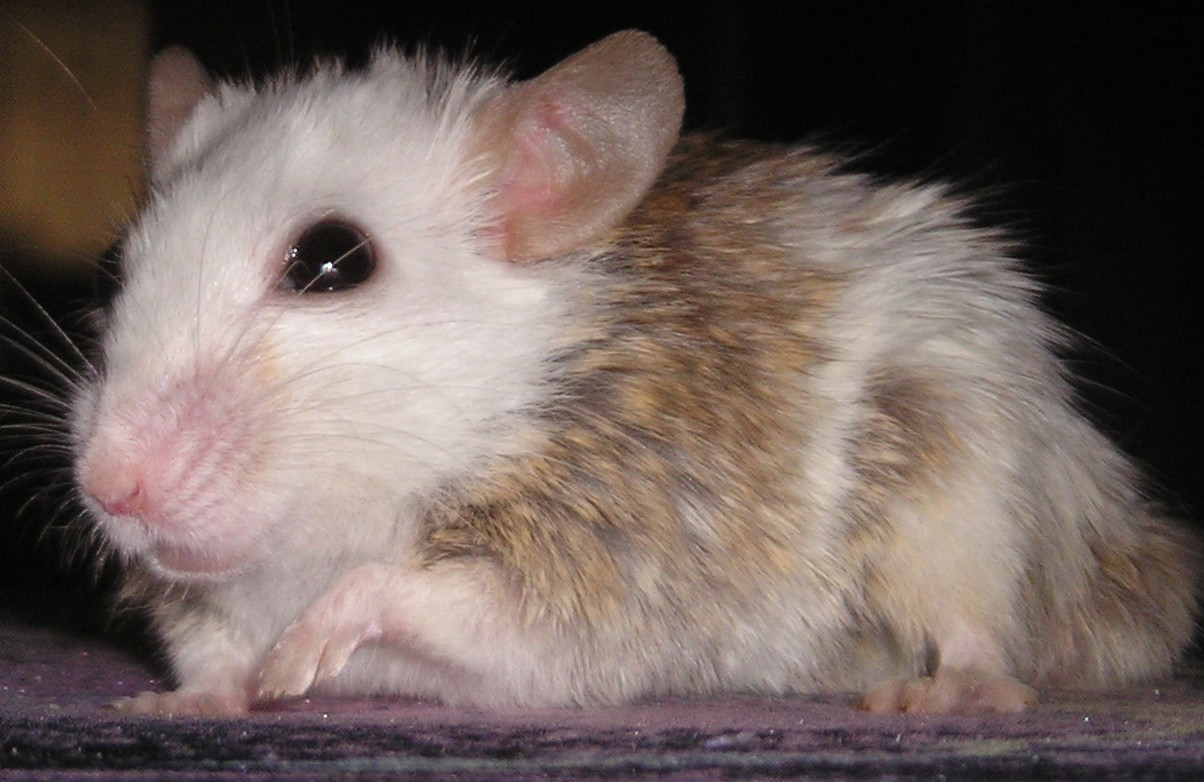

Conservation status
- Least Concern (IUCN 3.1)

Scientific classification
- Kingdom: Animalia
- Phylum: Chordata
- Class: Mammalia
- Order: Rodentia
- Family: Muridae
- Genus: Mastomys
- Species: M. coucha

Binomial name
- Mastomys coucha (Smith, 1834)

= Southern multimammate mouse =

Species of rodent

The southern multimammate mouse or southern African mastomys (Mastomys coucha) is a species of rodent in the family Muridae which is endemic to southern Africa (Angola, Botswana, Lesotho, Mozambique, Namibia, South Africa, and Zimbabwe). It is called a multimammate mouse because it can have 8 to 12 pairs of mammae (milk producing glands), in comparison other mouse species only have 5 pairs.

== Diet and habitat ==
The southern multimammate mouse is a nocturnal species considered to be an ecological generalist, and is found in a broad spectrum of natural habitats. These habitats include open grassland (dry and moist), shrubland (dry and moist), and semidesert karoo land. M. coucha is generally thought to have three main disjunct geographical populations, but recent studies have shown extensive haplotype sharing between the three populations.

M. coucha is an opportunist omnivore. Its diet consists of a variety of plant and animal resources, including cannibalism when under severe resource limitations. Due to this generalist behavior M. coucha is often found in disturbed environments (drought, fire, overgrazing, etc.) and its presence could be an indicator of an ecosystem's integrity.

== Identification ==
M. coucha is sympatric with M. natalensis and the two species cannot be distinguished by superficial appearance alone. M. coucha and M. natalensis can be definitively identified by karyotyping (they have different numbers of chromosomes) or DNA sequencing. However, on closer analysis they do have anatomical (cranial, dental and phallic morphology) and physiological (hemoglobin pattern and pheromones) differences.

Many academic labs and publicly available animals were derived from a colony originally misidentified as M. natalensis.

== Research ==
M. coucha has been used frequently in medical research. Unlike the common murine research model, M. coucha has been maintained as an outbred line so it has maintained the genetic heterogeneity necessary for many studies involving immune response. M. coucha also has a naturally occurring papillomavirus that mimics the infection cycle and symptoms seen in humans with HPVs. These two traits have made it a good model to study vaccines against HPV infections.

Similarly, unlike the common murine research model, M. coucha can support the complete lifecycle of B. malayi, a parasite that causes lymphatic filariasis. This has made it a key tool in discovering new drugs and vaccines to fight an infection that affects an estimated 130 million people.

== Domestication ==
The southern multimammate rat is currently being bred in the US and Canada as a pet, and as a replacement food source for reptiles, replacing the brown rat as a viable food source for picky eaters. It is also recognized as one of the natural food sources for ball pythons. They are also being used for stomach cancer research, among other ailments. Europeans have begun breeding them for companion animal use, namely in Germany and England. This trend is also catching, slowly, in the US and Canada.

Only recently has it been introduced to the pet trade, and is more often kept as a feeder rodent for snakes than as a pet.
