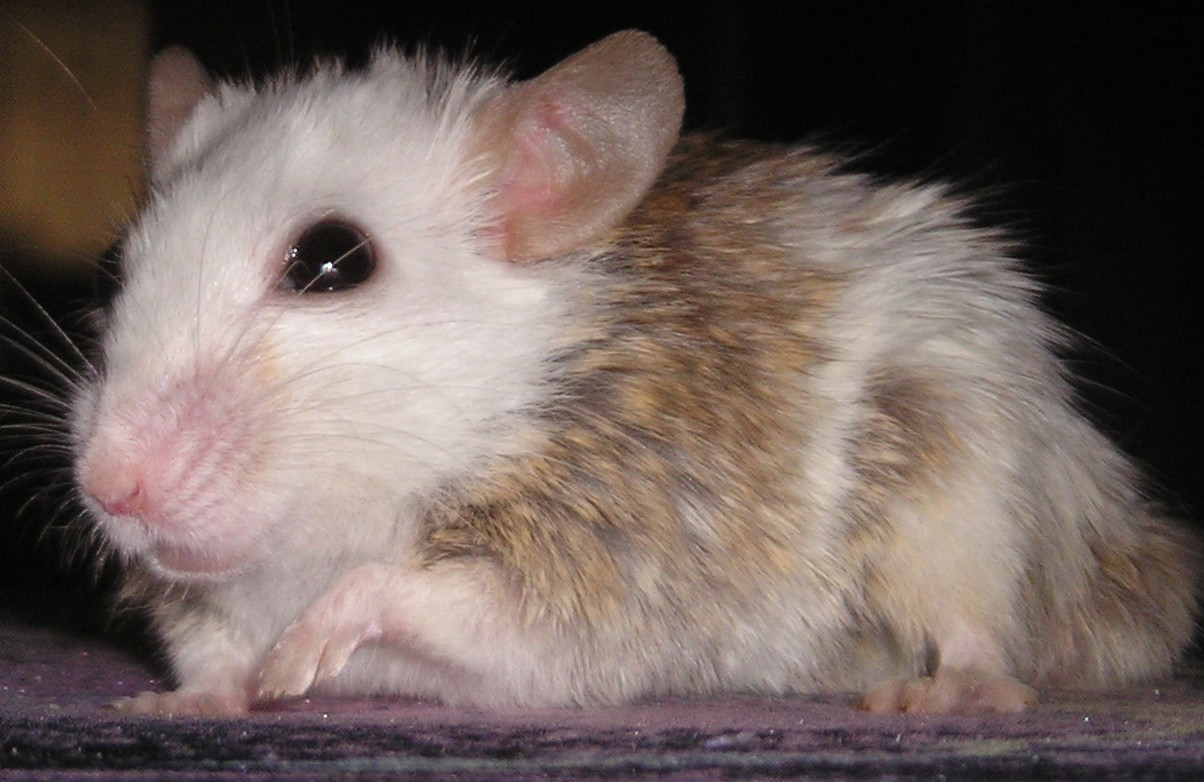
- Southern multimammate mouse (Mastomys coucha)

Scientific classification
- Kingdom: Animalia
- Phylum: Chordata
- Class: Mammalia
- Order: Rodentia
- Family: Muridae
- Tribe: Praomyini
- Genus: Mastomys; Thomas, 1915

Type species
- Mus coucha

Species
- Mastomys angolensis Mastomys awashensis Mastomys coucha Mastomys erythroleucus Mastomys huberti Mastomys kollmannspergeri Mastomys natalensis Mastomys shortridgei

= Mastomys =

Mastomys Temporal range: Late Pliocene to recent

Genus of rodents

Mastomys is a genus of rodent in the family Muridae endemic to Africa. It contains eight species:

- Angolan multimammate mouse (M. angolensis)
- Awash multimammate mouse or Awash mastomys (M. awashensis)
- Southern multimammate mouse (M. coucha)
- Guinea multimammate mouse (M. erythroleucus)
- Hubert's multimammate mouse (M. huberti)
- Verheyen's multimammate mouse (M. kollmannspergeri)
- Natal multimammate mouse (M. natalensis)
- Shortridge's multimammate mouse (M. shortridgei)

The multimammate mice (also called multimammate rats, African soft-furred rats, natal-rats or African common rats) are found in most parts of sub-Saharan Africa. Their head-body length is between 10 and 15 cm, their tail length is between 8 and 15 centimetres (3.1 and 5.9 in), and their weight varies between 20 and 80 grams (0.71 and 2.82 oz), depending on the species. Domesticated multimammate mice are heavier on average, weighing from 60 to 120 grams (2.1 to 4.2 oz). Mastomys species are omnivorous, and can live up to four years.

Systematically, they were long placed in the genus Rattus (referred to as Rattus natalensis). Later they were placed in the genus Mus (referred to as Mus natalensis) and then they were placed in the genus Praomys. Today, molecular research has discovered that they are a genus of their own (Mastomys) and that they are closely related to Praomys. They are also more closely related to Mus than to Rattus. The dwarf multimammate mouse (Serengetimys pernanus) was formerly classified in this genus, but has now been moved to its own genus.
