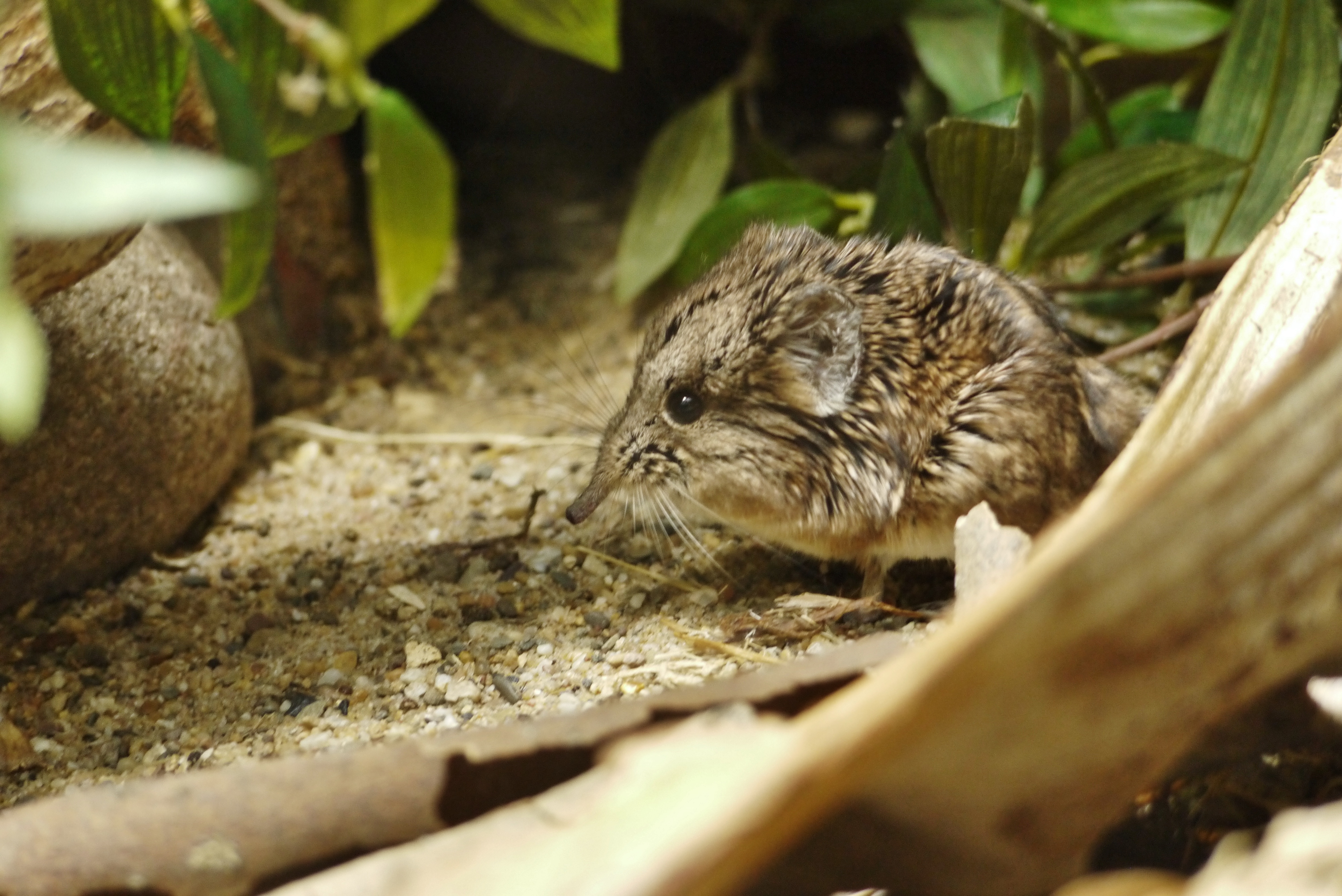
- Macroscelides proboscideus

Scientific classification
- Kingdom: Animalia
- Phylum: Chordata
- Class: Mammalia
- Infraclass: Placentalia
- Order: Macroscelidea
- Family: Macroscelididae
- Genus: Macroscelides; A. Smith, 1829

Type species
- Macroscelides typus A. Smith, 1829 (= Sorex proboscideus Shaw, 1800)

Species
- Macroscelides flavicaudatus Macroscelides micus Macroscelides proboscideus

= Macroscelides =

Genus of mammals

Macroscelides is a genus of small shrew-like animals, the round-eared sengis, found in western Namibia and in South Africa; they are members of the clade Afrotheria.

There are three known species:

- Namib round-eared sengi, Macroscelides flavicaudatus
- Etendaka round-eared sengi, Macroscelides micus, which is only found in gravel plains in the Etendaka formation of north-west Namibia
- Karoo round-eared sengi, Macroscelides proboscideus
