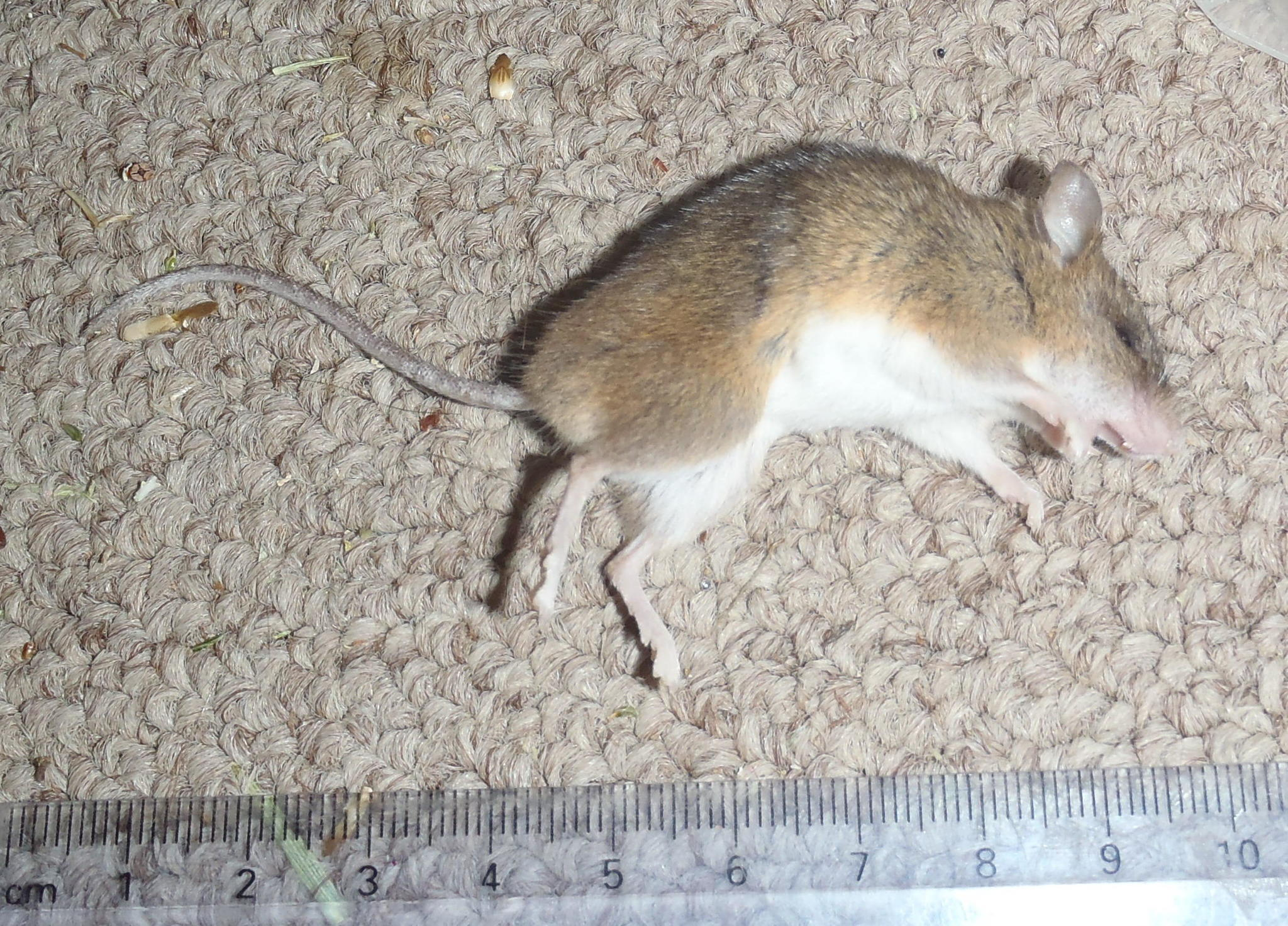

Conservation status
- Least Concern (IUCN 3.1)

Scientific classification
- Domain: Eukaryota
- Kingdom: Animalia
- Phylum: Chordata
- Class: Mammalia
- Order: Rodentia
- Family: Nesomyidae
- Genus: Steatomys
- Species: S. krebsii

Binomial name
- Steatomys krebsii Peters, 1852

= Krebs's fat mouse =

Species of rodent

The Krebs's fat mouse (Steatomys krebsii) is a species of rodent in the family Nesomyidae. It is found in Angola, Botswana, Lesotho, Namibia, South Africa, and Zambia. Its natural habitats are Mediterranean-type shrubby vegetation and subtropical or tropical high-altitude grassland. Its name honours Georg Ludwig Engelhard Krebs (1792–1844), a German natural history collector in South Africa.
