= Jackson's fat mouse =

Conservation status
- Data Deficient (IUCN 3.1)

Scientific classification
- Kingdom: Animalia
- Phylum: Chordata
- Class: Mammalia
- Order: Rodentia
- Family: Nesomyidae
- Genus: Steatomys
- Species: S. jacksoni

Binomial name
- Steatomys jacksoni Hayman, 1936

Species of rodent

The Jackson's fat mouse (Steatomys jacksoni) is a species of rodent in the family Nesomyidae. It is found in Ghana, Nigeria and possibly Benin. Its natural habitats are arable land.
