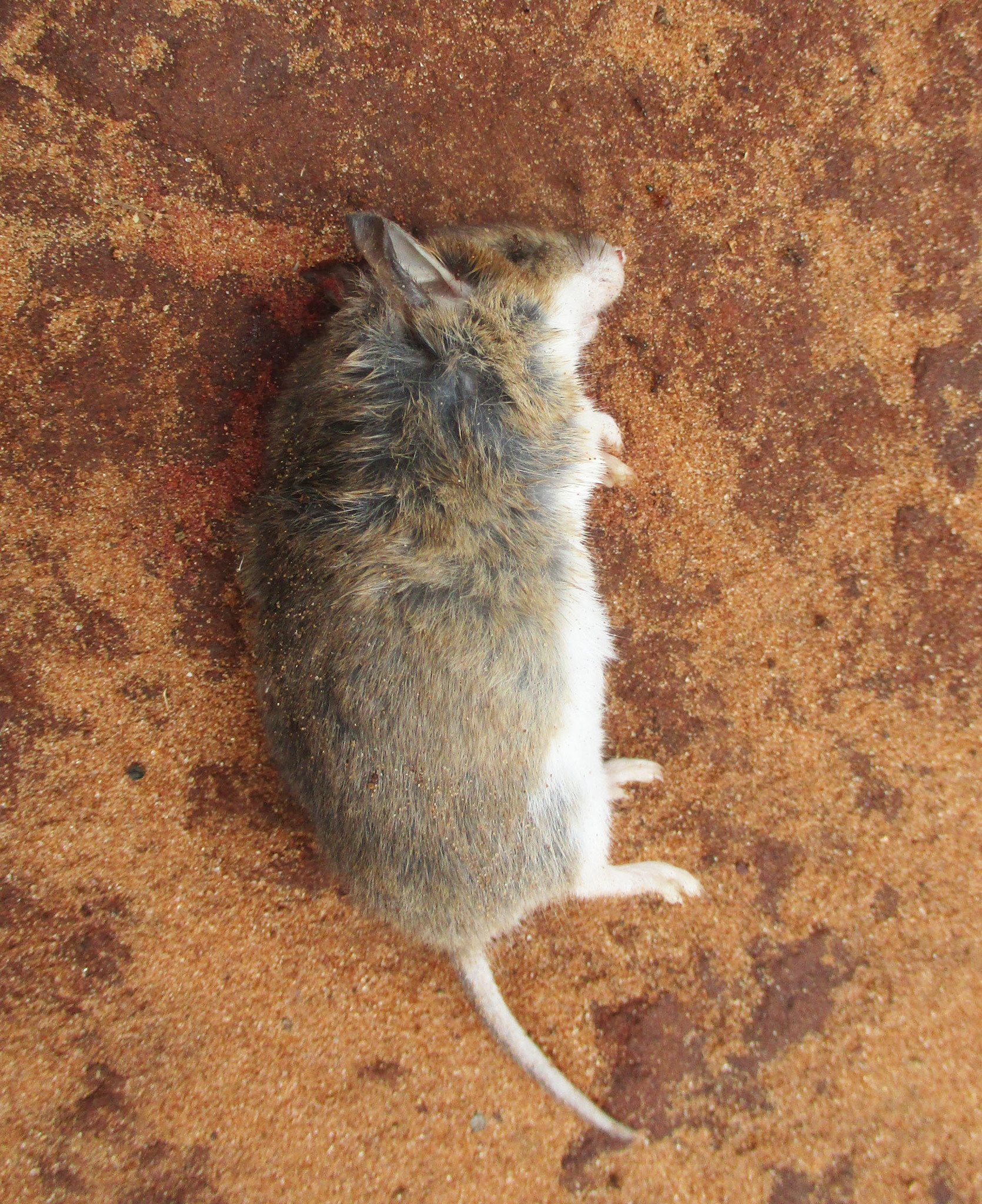

Conservation status
- Least Concern (IUCN 3.1)

Scientific classification
- Domain: Eukaryota
- Kingdom: Animalia
- Phylum: Chordata
- Class: Mammalia
- Order: Rodentia
- Family: Nesomyidae
- Genus: Steatomys
- Species: S. pratensis

Binomial name
- Steatomys pratensis Peters, 1846

= Fat mouse =

Species of rodent

The fat mouse (Steatomys pratensis) is a species of rodent in the family Nesomyidae. It is found in Angola, Botswana, Cameroon, Democratic Republic of the Congo, Malawi, Mozambique, Namibia, South Africa, Tanzania, Zambia, and Zimbabwe. Its natural habitats are dry savanna and subtropical or tropical dry lowland grassland.
