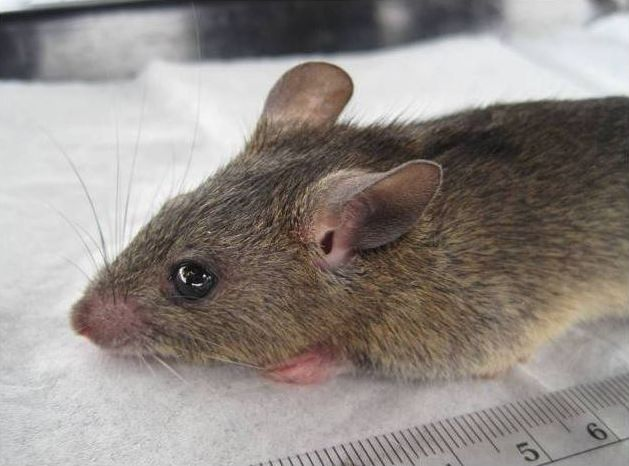

Conservation status
- Least Concern (IUCN 3.1)

Scientific classification
- Kingdom: Animalia
- Phylum: Chordata
- Class: Mammalia
- Order: Rodentia
- Family: Muridae
- Genus: Mastomys
- Species: M. natalensis

Binomial name
- Mastomys natalensis (Smith, 1834)

Synonyms
- List: Mastomys hildebrandtii (Peters, 1878); Myomys fumatus (Peters, 1878); Mus hildelbrandtii Peters, 1878; Mus fumatus Peters, 1878; Mus caffer Smith, 1834; Mus coucha zuluensis Thomas & Schwann, 1905; Mastomys coucha komatiensis Roberts, 1926; Mastomys coucha ovamboensis Roberts, 1926; Epimys concha ismailiae Heller, 1914; Epimys concha durumae Heller, 1912; Epimys concha neumanni Heller, 1912; Epimys panya Heller, 1910; Praomys fumatus (Peters, 1878); Mus natalensis Smith, 1834

= Natal multimammate mouse =

Species of mammal

The Natal multimammate mouse (Mastomys natalensis) is a species of rodent in the family Muridae. It is also known as the Natal multimammate rat, the common African rat, African soft fur rat or the African soft-furred mouse. The Natal multimammate rat is the natural host of the Lassa fever virus.

== Range ==
It is found in Africa south of the Sahara. Six different genetic groups can be distinguished in different regions: one in western Africa, one in central Africa, one in southern Africa and three in eastern Africa.

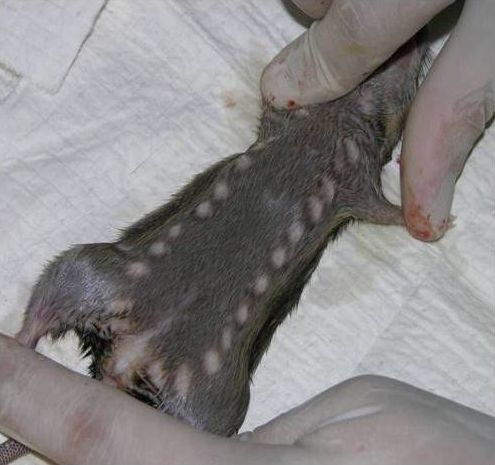
Mastomys natalensis is commonly known as the “multimammate rat” due to the female’s multiple and prominent mammary glands

== Habitat ==
Its natural habitats include subtropical or tropical dry forest, subtropical or tropical moist lowland forest, dry savanna, moist savanna, subtropical or tropical dry shrubland, subtropical or tropical moist shrubland, arable land, pastureland, rural gardens, urban areas, irrigated land, and seasonally flooded agricultural land.

These rats are closely associated with humans, and are commonly found in and around African villages.

== Interactions with humans ==
The species has been used as a laboratory animal since 1939. It has great value for researchers studying stomach cancer and spontaneous tumors. It is also the most important reservoir of the Lassa fever virus. It is also bred domestically as food for various pet snake species such as ball pythons and boa constrictors. Additionally, it is occasionally kept as a pet.
