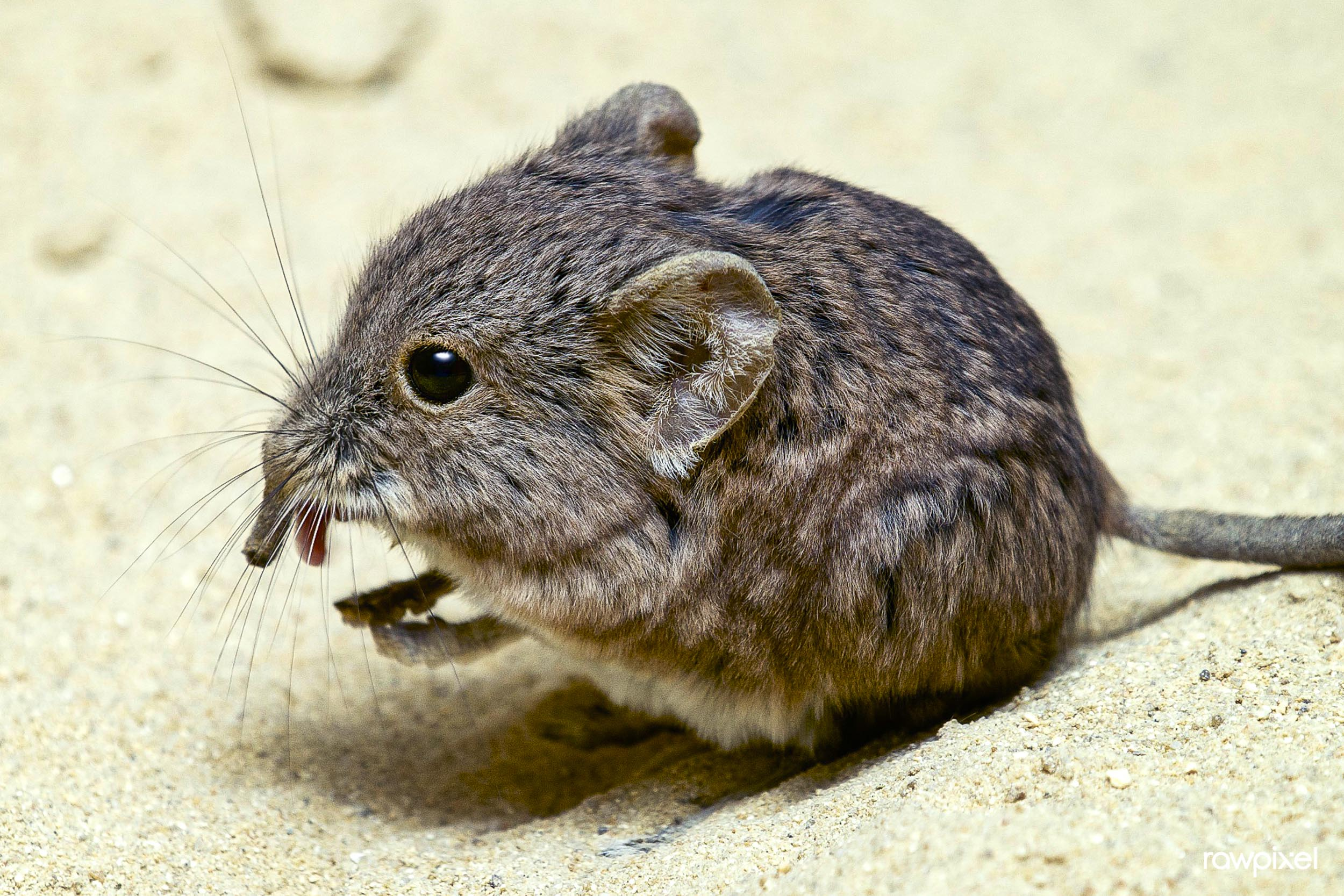

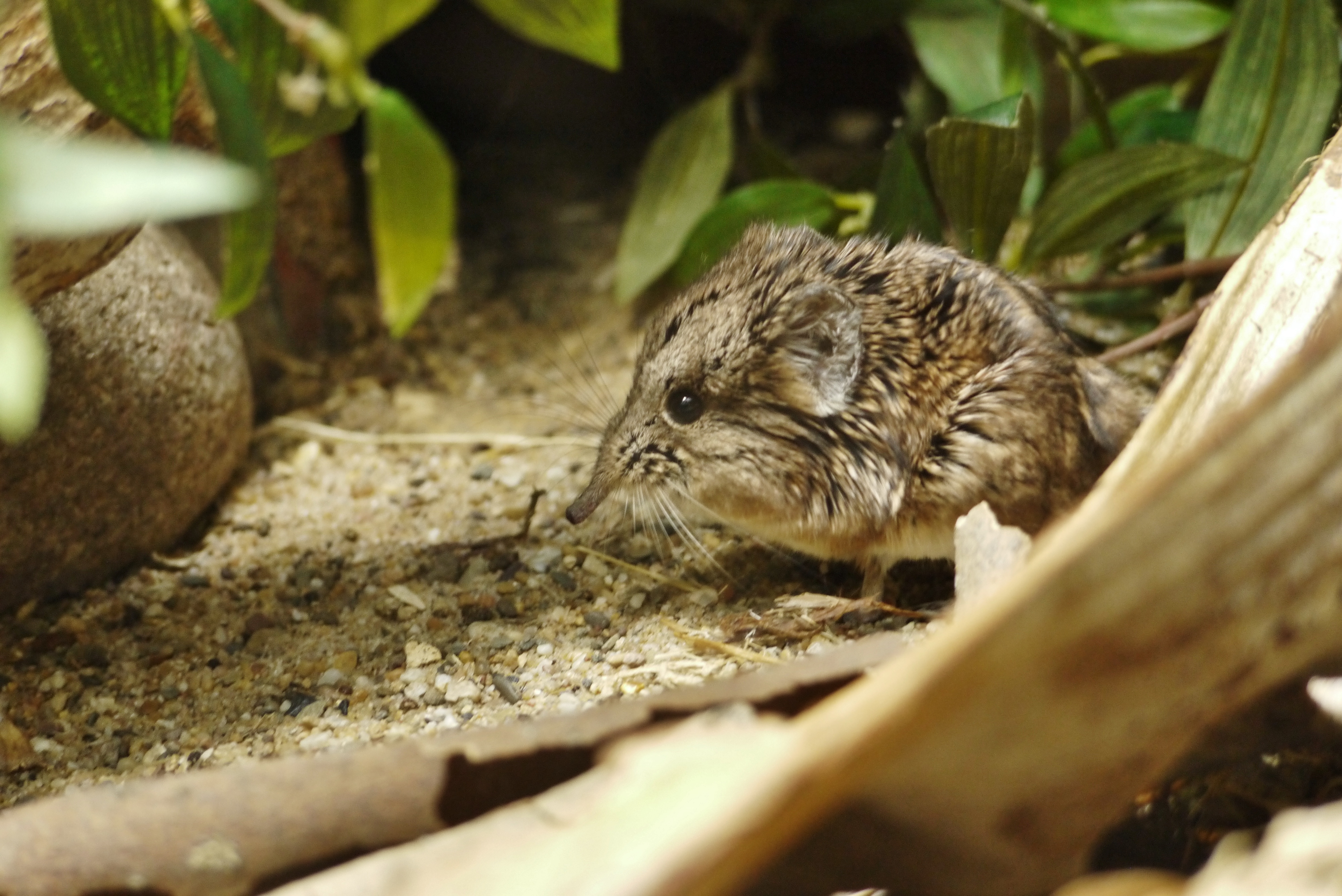

Conservation status
- Least Concern (IUCN 3.1)

Scientific classification
- Kingdom: Animalia
- Phylum: Chordata
- Class: Mammalia
- Order: Macroscelidea
- Family: Macroscelididae
- Genus: Macroscelides
- Species: M. proboscideus

Binomial name
- Macroscelides proboscideus (Shaw, 1800)
- Geographic range

= Karoo round-eared sengi =

Species of mammal

The round-eared sengi or round-eared elephant shrew (Macroscelides proboscideus), also called the Karoo round-eared sengi or Karoo round-eared sengi to distinguish it from its sister species, is a species of small mammal belonging to the sengi family (Macroscelididae), and distantly (ancestrally) related to elephants. It is found in Botswana, Namibia, and South Africa. Its natural habitats are subtropical or tropical dry shrubland, and grassland, and hot deserts. They eat insects, shoots, and roots. Their gestation period is 56 days. The species was formerly misleadingly called the short-eared sengi or short-eared elephant shrew.

Sengis are among only a handful of monogamous mammals, making them a model group for the study of monogamy. They have been studied for their mate guarding behavior. Mate guarding is considered a predominant male trait in round-eared sengis. This strategy is used to guard the female before and after heat to eliminate male competition, which makes male round-eared sengis monogamous and more vulnerable to their surroundings as they spent a majority of their time dedicated to this tactic.

Research was recently conducted to determine that sengis are thought to have dichromatic color vision due to their ability to differentiate between blue/green colors and grey. However, there is no evidence to prove that the species can see red colors.

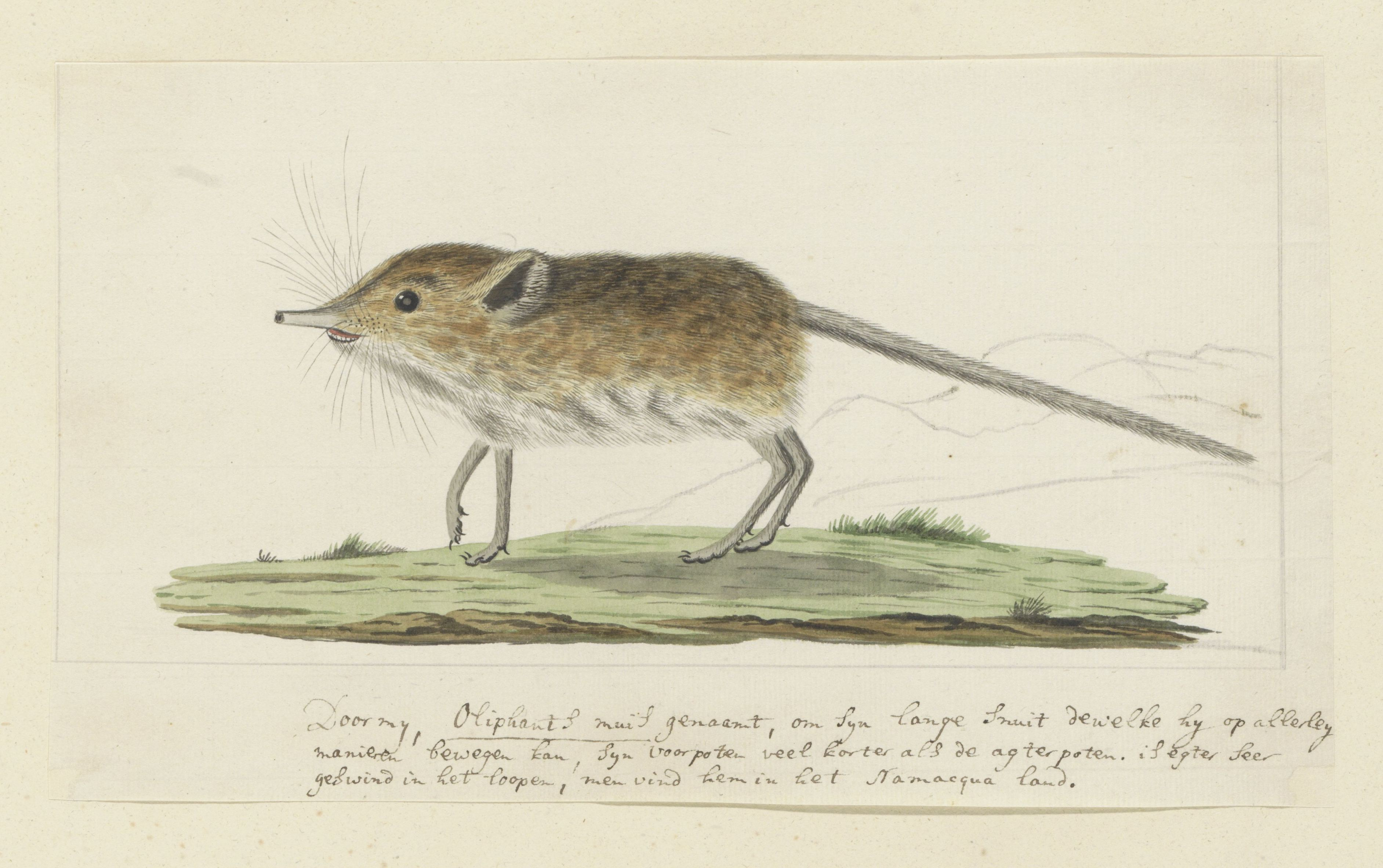
Round-eared sengi (Macroscelides proboscideus), as described by Robert Jacob Gordon in 1779–1780

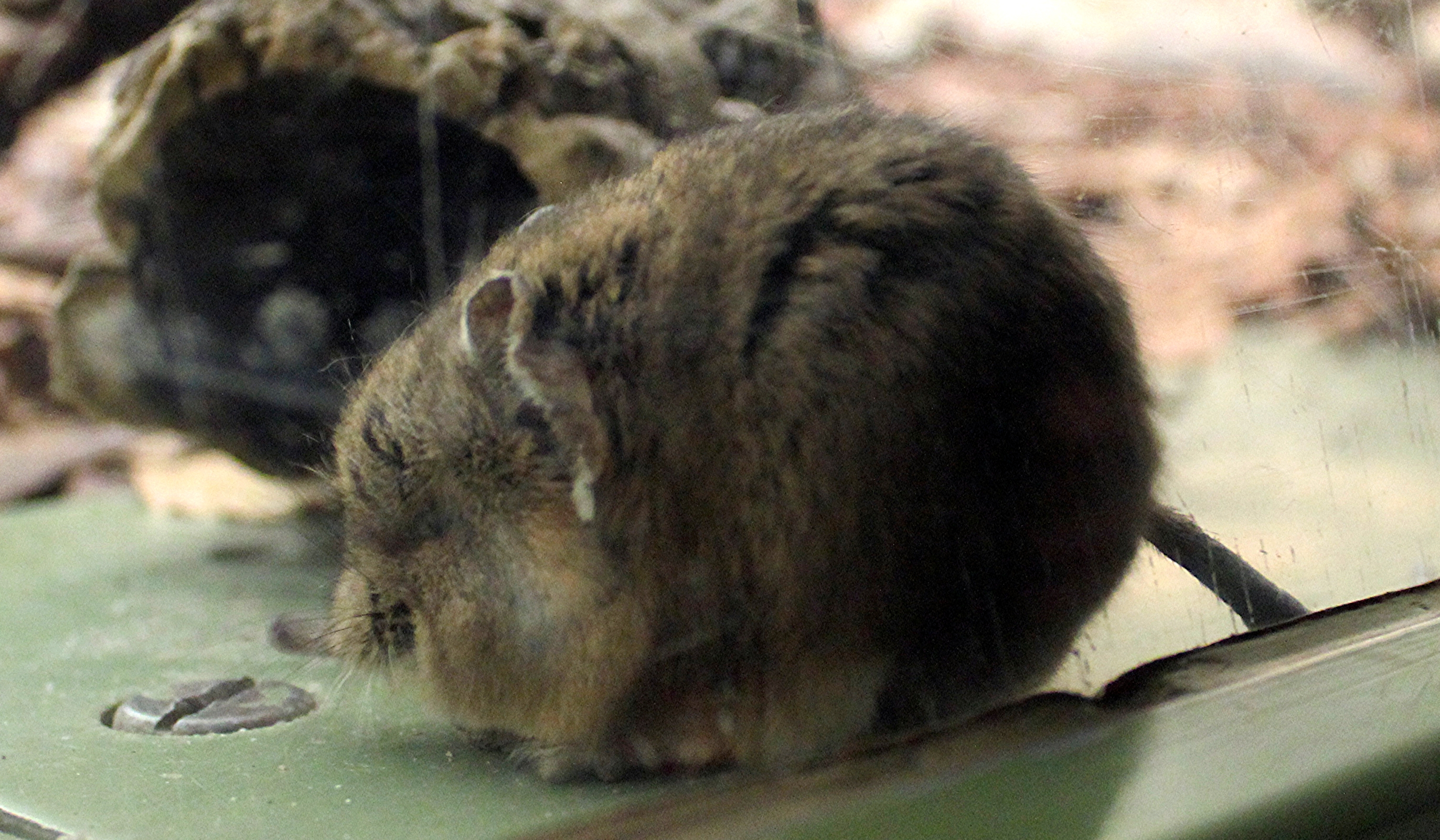
Round-eared sengi (Macroscelides proboscideus) at Frankfurt Zoo

== Habitat ==
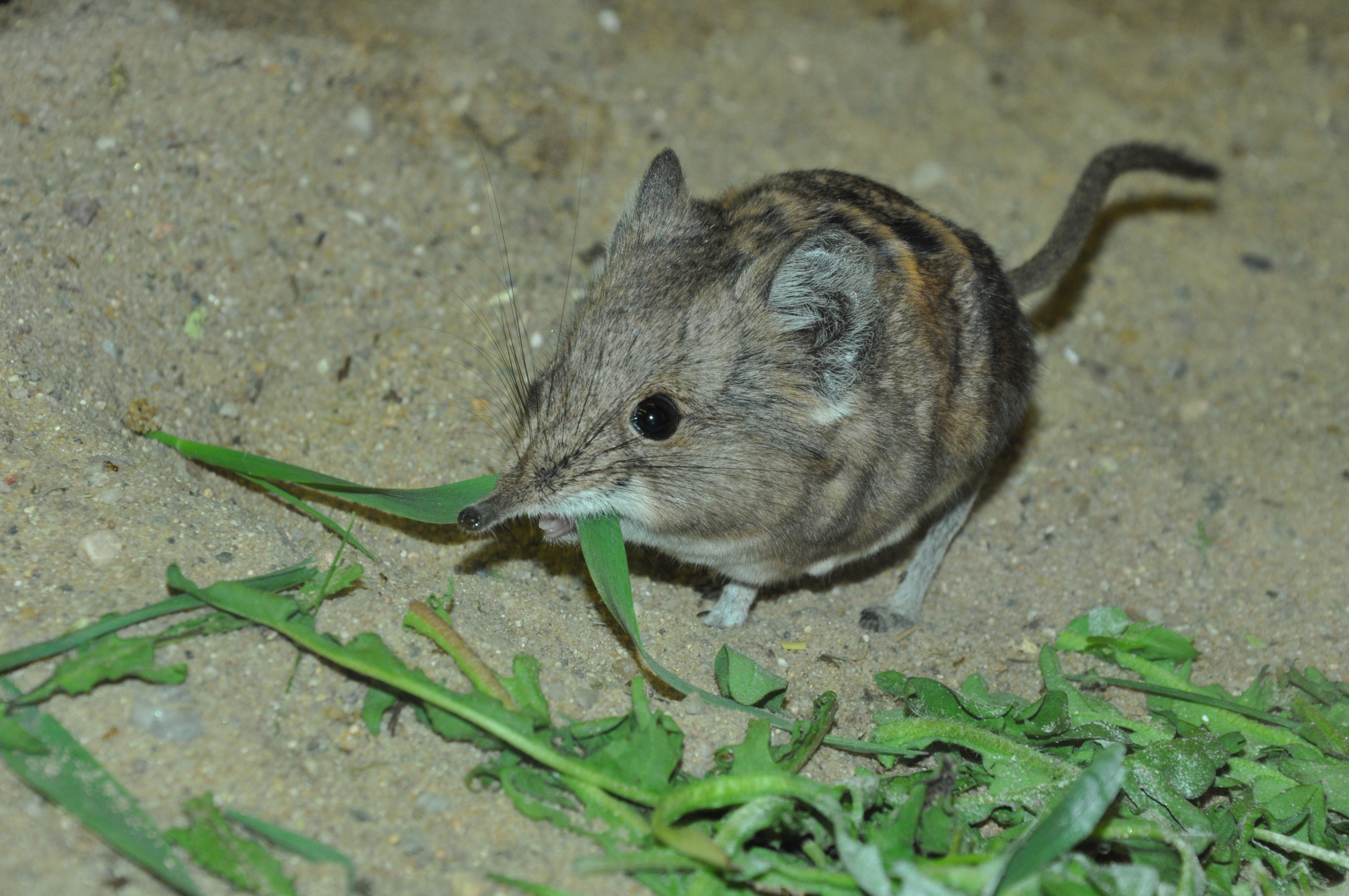
At Prague Zoo

The round-eared sengi are native to Southeast Africa where the temperature ranges from 18 to 6 °C (64 to 43 °F) in the winter and 30 to 22 °C (86 to 72 °F) during the summer.

== Foraging and diet ==
Round-eared sengis are omnivores with their diet mainly consisting of insects and supplemented with plants. During the winter, this species consumes less insects than they do during the summer due to a decrease in the insect population.

== Reproduction and life cycles ==
The round-eared sengi does not reproduce during the winter.
