= Arabuko Sokoke National Park =

National Park in Kenya

- Hifadhi ya Taifa ya Arabuko Sokoke
- IUCN category II (national park)
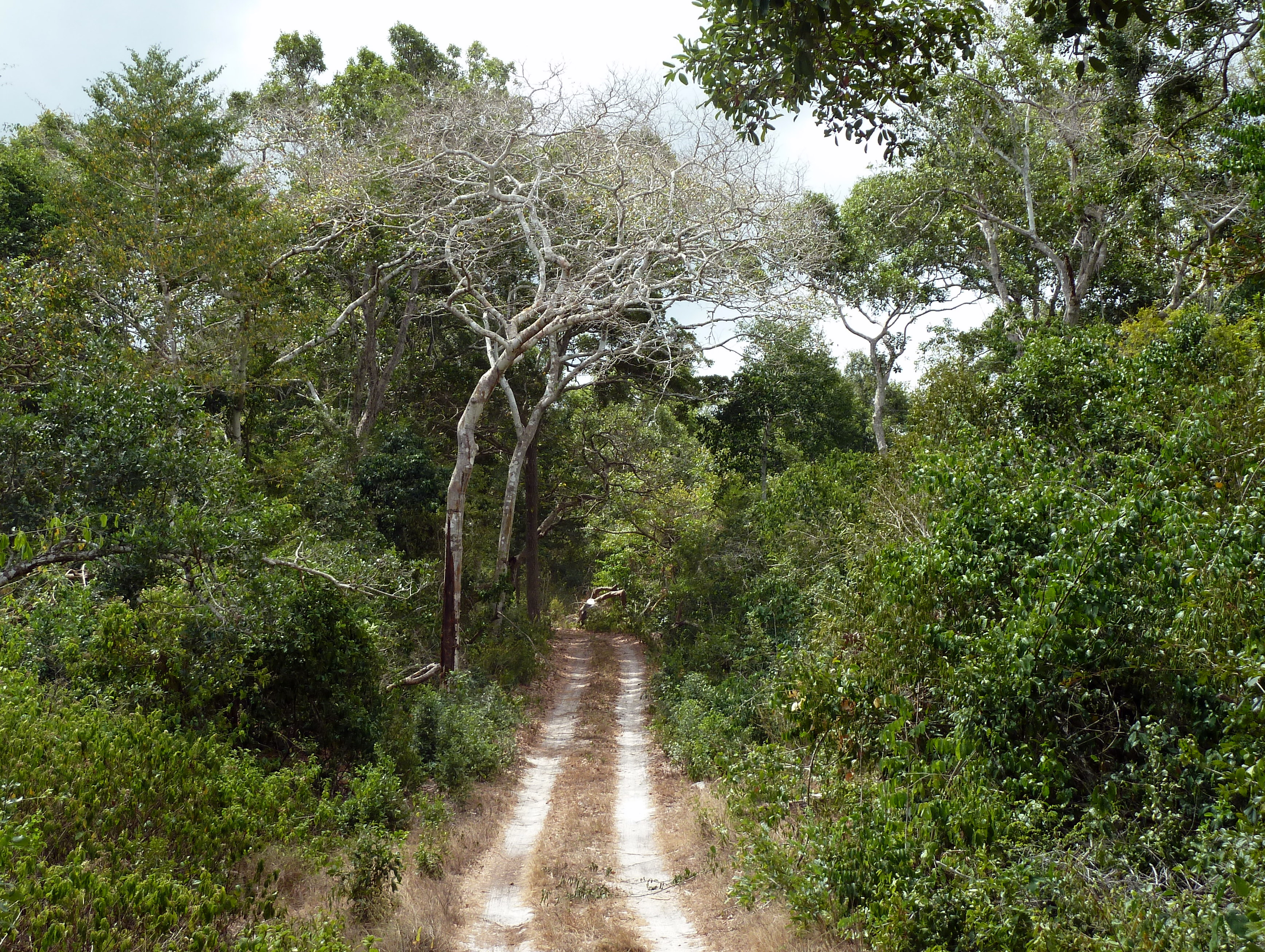
- track in the forest

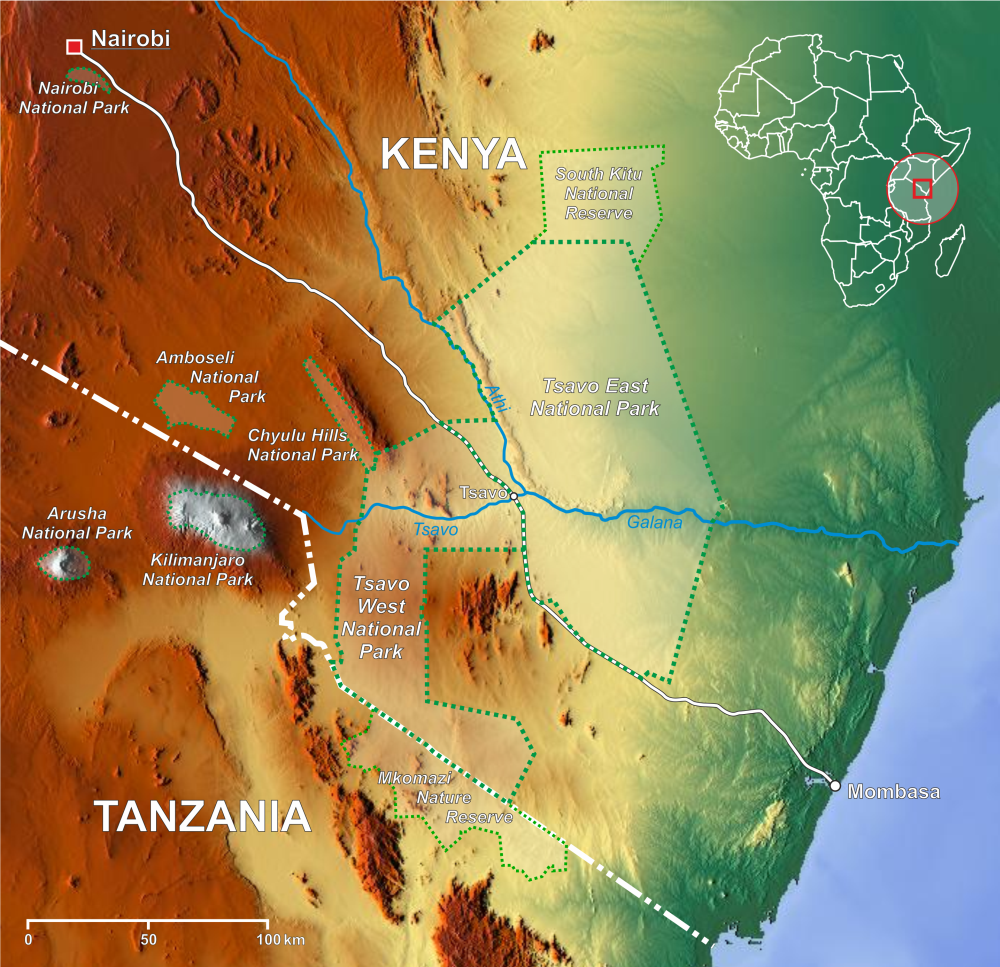
- Location within Tsavo national parks
- Location: Coast Province, Kenya
- Nearest city: Malindi
- Coordinates: 3°16′S 39°49′E
- Area: 6 km^{2} (2.3 sq mi)
- Established: 1990
- Governing body: Kenya Wildlife Service

The Arabuko Sokoke Forest Reserve is located on the coast of Kenya, 110 km north of Mombasa and is protected as a national Forest Reserve. The Arabuko Sokoke National Park, situated at the north-western edge of the Arabuko Sokoke Forest Reserve, is only a few square kilometres in size and constitutes only a small portion of the latter.

== Protection ==
The National Park was gazetted only in the late 1980s and straddles the Forest Reserve boundary, with about 50% lying outside the boundary. This outer section lies outside an electric elephant fence installed in 2006/7 and is now fully inhabited by local communities to the extent that there is no sign of where the National Park begins or ends. The National Park doesn't add any particular protection to the forest which is the largest fragment of coastal forest only 420 square kilometres) left in East Africa.

The Forest Reserve, is jointly managed by the Kenya Forest Service, Kenya Wildlife Service, National Museums of Kenya and the Kenya Forest Research Institute, Community Forest Associations and Friends of Arabuko Sokoke Forest, and is one of the better protected forests in Kenya. The forest was first protected as a Crown Forest in 1943, and was gazetted in the 1960s. The forest is threatened by the desire for land by local people. Several national and international conservation organisations are working with the Kenya Wildlife Service to protect the park.

== Wildlife ==
The Arabuko Sokoke Forest is an area of high endemism, containing endemic mammals, birds and plants. It contains three forest types, mixed forest, Brachystegia and Cynometra, each of which protects different communities of plants and animals.

Protected are many endemic and near-endemic species. The Clarke's weaver is completely endemic to the forest, while the eponymous Sokoke scops owl, Sokoke pipit, and the Amani sunbird and spotted ground thrush are found only here and in a forest fragment in Tanzania. The park adjoins Mida Creek, a mangrove forest that is an important shorebird wintering ground, protecting species such as the Terek sandpiper and the crab plover.

The endearing leopard, golden-rumped elephant shrew, an endemic elephant shrew, is the most noticeable of the park's endemic mammals; the Sokoke bushy-tailed mongoose and Aders's duiker (found only here and in Zanzibar) are more elusive. The forest also has savannah elephants, African civets, as well as sokokes, baboons and vervet monkeys. The park is recognised as an outstanding centre of amphibian diversity.

== Gallery ==
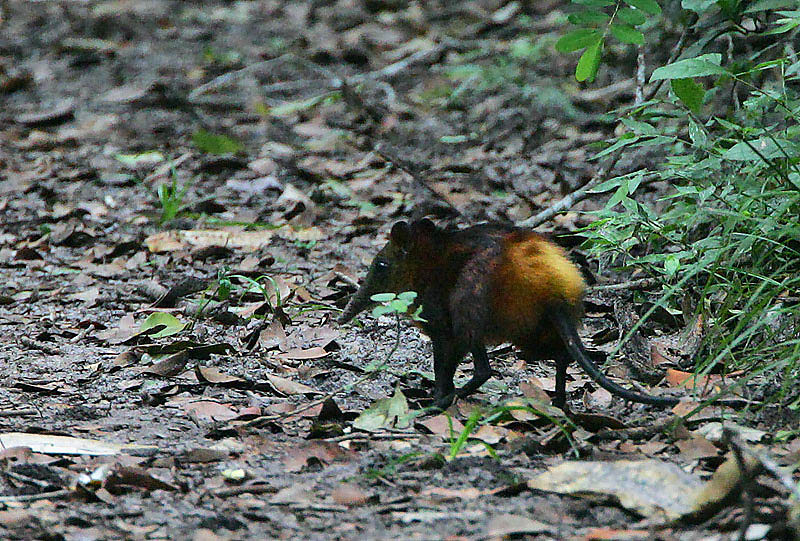
Golden-rumped elephant shrew in Arabuko Sokoke

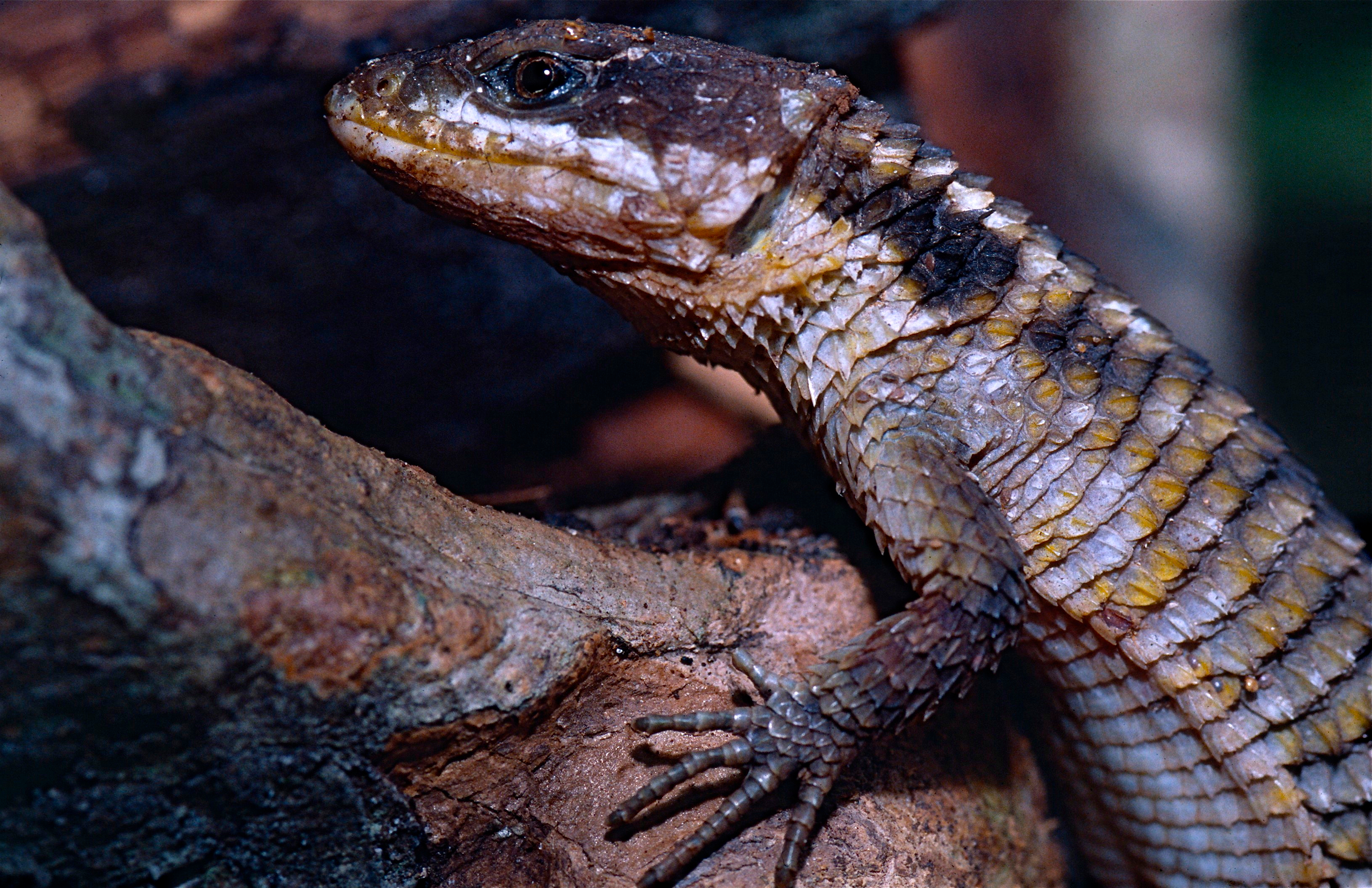
Tropical girdled lizard in Arabuko Sokoke

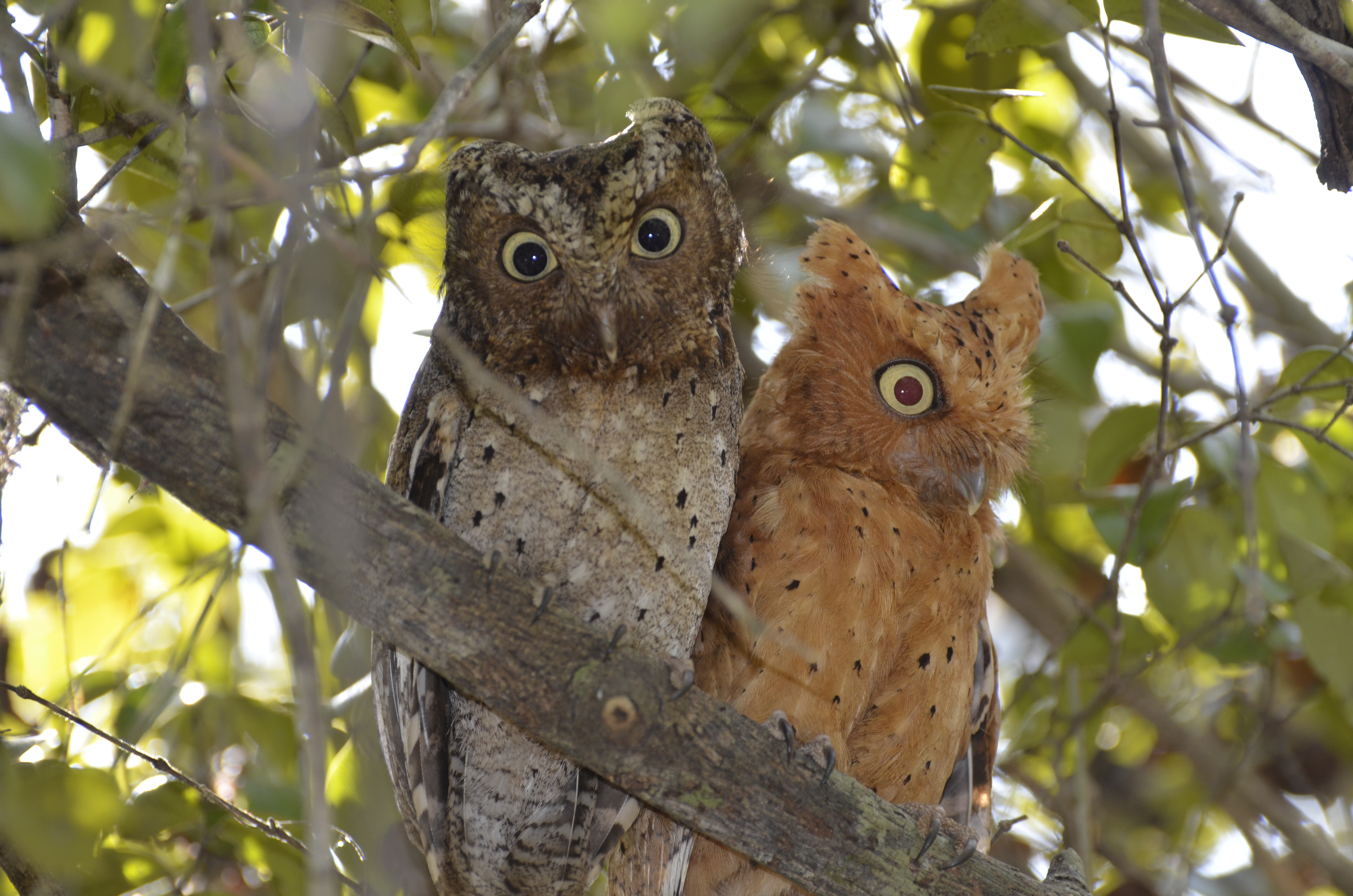
Sokoke scops owl pair in Arabuko Sokoke

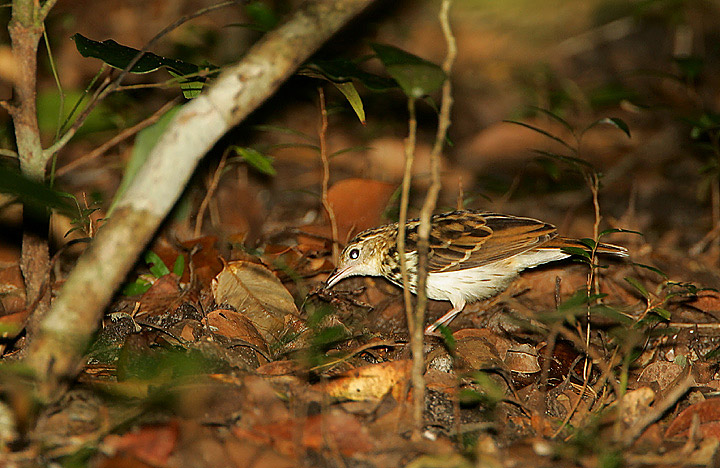
Sokoke pipit on the forest floor

== See also ==
- Coastal forests of eastern Africa
- Cameraria sokoke
