= Coastal forests of eastern Africa =

Tropical moist forest region in Africa

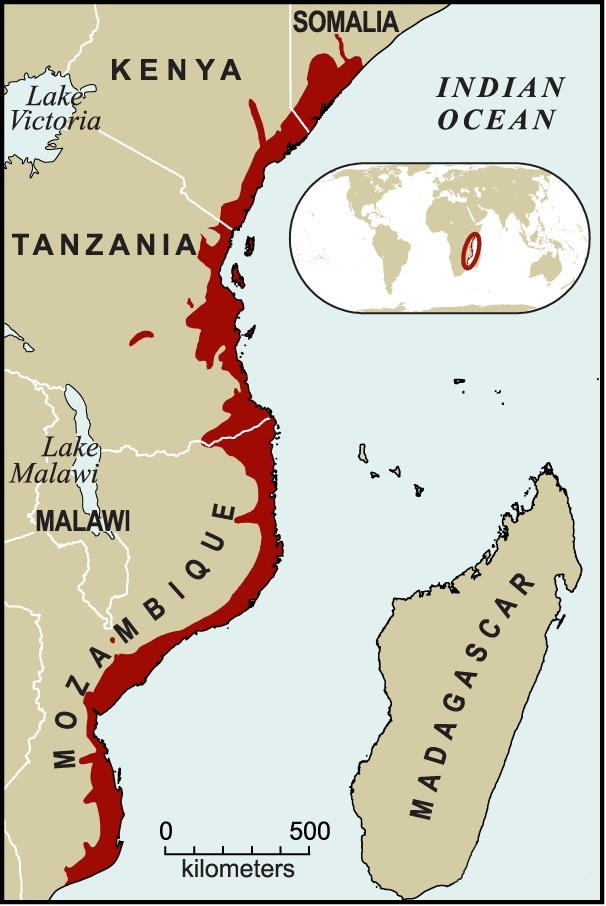
Area of incidence

The Coastal forests of eastern Africa, also known as the East African Coastal Forests or Zanzibar–Inhambane forests, is a tropical moist forest region along the east coast of Africa. The region was designated a biodiversity hotspot by Conservation International.

== Geography ==
The forests extend in a narrow band along the coast of the Indian Ocean, from southern Somalia in the north, through coastal Kenya and Tanzania to the mouth of the Limpopo River in southern Mozambique. The forest belt is 50 to 200 km wide, and extends further west along river valleys. They are bounded on the west by drier grasslands and savannas. Pockets of coastal forest grow on the windward eastern slopes of mountains further inland, including the Eastern Arc Mountains of Tanzania and Kenya and some inselbergs in northern Mozambique, where rainfall and dry-season humidity are higher than the adjacent lowlands.

The World Wildlife Fund divides the coastal forests into two ecoregions: the Northern Zanzibar-Inhambane coastal forest mosaic, which extends from southern Somalia through coastal Kenya to southern Tanzania, and includes the islands of Zanzibar and Pemba, and the Southern Zanzibar-Inhambane coastal forest mosaic, which extends from southern Tanzania along the Mozambique coast to the mouth of the Limpopo.

== Climate ==
Rainfall averages from 800 and 1200 mm per year in most of the coastal belt, with a well-defined dry season. Rainfall is similar to the interior savannas, but humidity in the coastal belt is higher during the dry season. A few places have higher rainfall, including the islands of Unguja (Zanzibar) and Pemba and the eastern slopes of the Usambara Mountains.

== Flora ==
Forest was once the primary climax vegetation across most of the region. Most primary forest has been replaced by secondary wooded grassland, agriculture, and forest plantations. Frank White (1983) identified ten characteristic plant communities:

- Zanzibar-Inhambane lowland rain forest It found mostly in Tanzania, on the windward (east-facing) slopes of the Uluguru, Nguru, and Usambara Mountains, and in parts of Ulanga and Iringa districts. Trees form a closed evergreen canopy up to 20 metres tall, with emergent trees up to 40 metres tall. It is now reduced to small remnant patches.
- Transitional rain forest grows at middle elevations above 800 metres in the Usambara and other nearby mountains. It is a transition between lowland and montane forests, and includes a mix of lowland and Afromontane species, along with many endemic species. The Amani Forest in Tanzania's Usambara mountains is the most intact remnant of this forest type.
- Zanzibar-Inhambane undifferentiated forest varies in form and species composition based on rainfall and soils. In moister areas, trees form a canopy 15-20 metres high, with emergents of 30 or 35 metres. Many trees are evergreen, while others are briefly deciduous.
- Zanzibar-Inhambane scrub forest. In Somalia and Kenya, scrub forest grows in a band between coastal forests and the drier bushlands of the interior. It is also found near the coast in Kenya and Tanzania, often on coral rag.
- Swamp forest grows in limited areas in the coastal lowlands, often inland from coastal mangroves and extending along the lower reaches of rivers. Barringtonia racemosa is the predominant tree. Swamp forests of Raffia palm grow in low-lying areas of Pemba Island.
- Zanzibar-Inhambane transition woodland
- Zanzibar-Inhambane woodland and scrub woodland
- Zanzibar-Inhambane evergreen and semi-evergreen bushland and thicket
- Zanzibar-Inhambane edaphic grassland
- Zanzibar-Inhambane secondary grassland and wooded grassland

White (1983) estimated 3000 plant species were native to the region, of which several hundred are endemic. Of 192 native forest trees recorded by White, 90, or nearly half, are endemic.

== Gallery ==
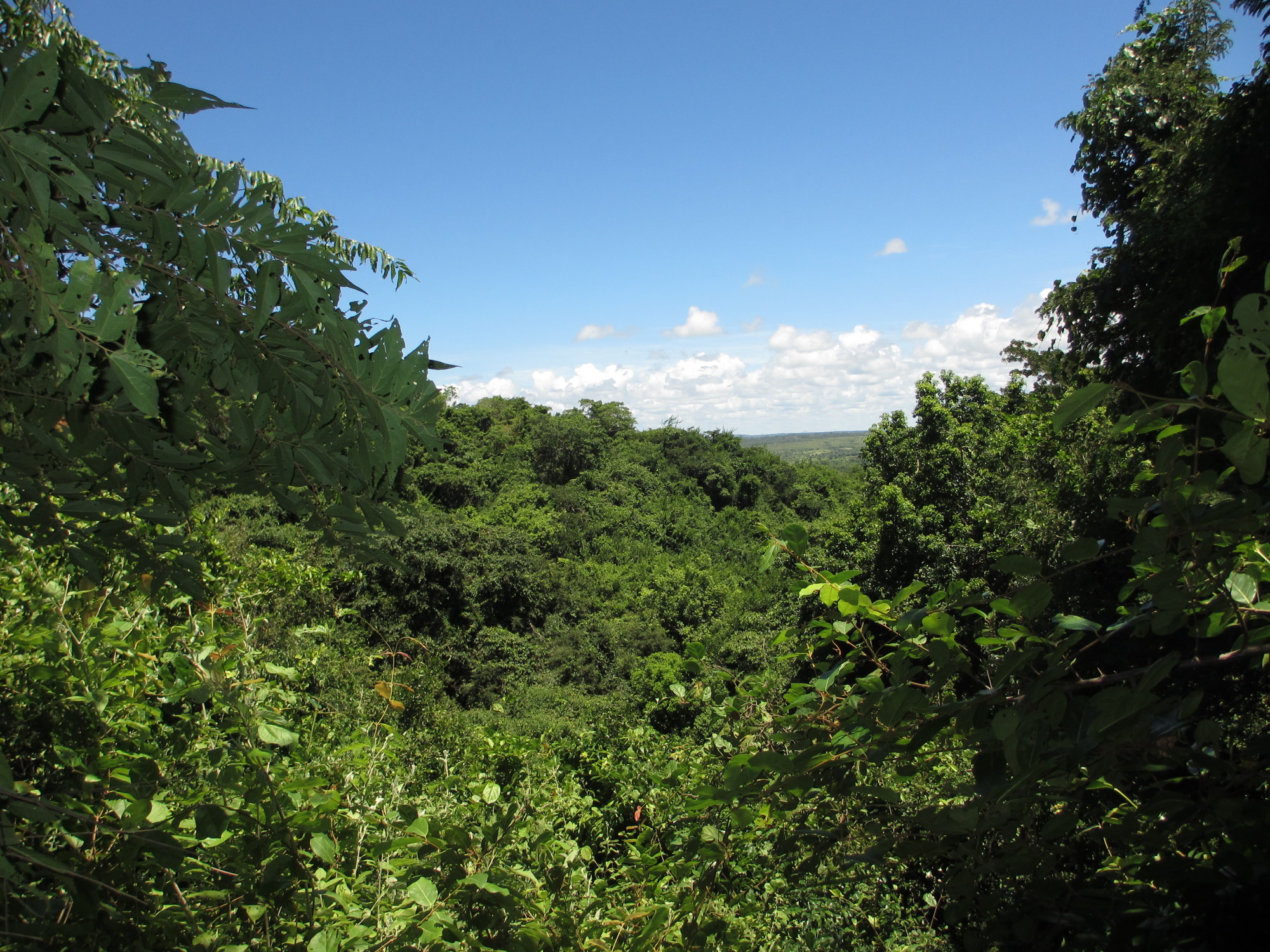
A moist forested gulley at Pemba, Mozambique

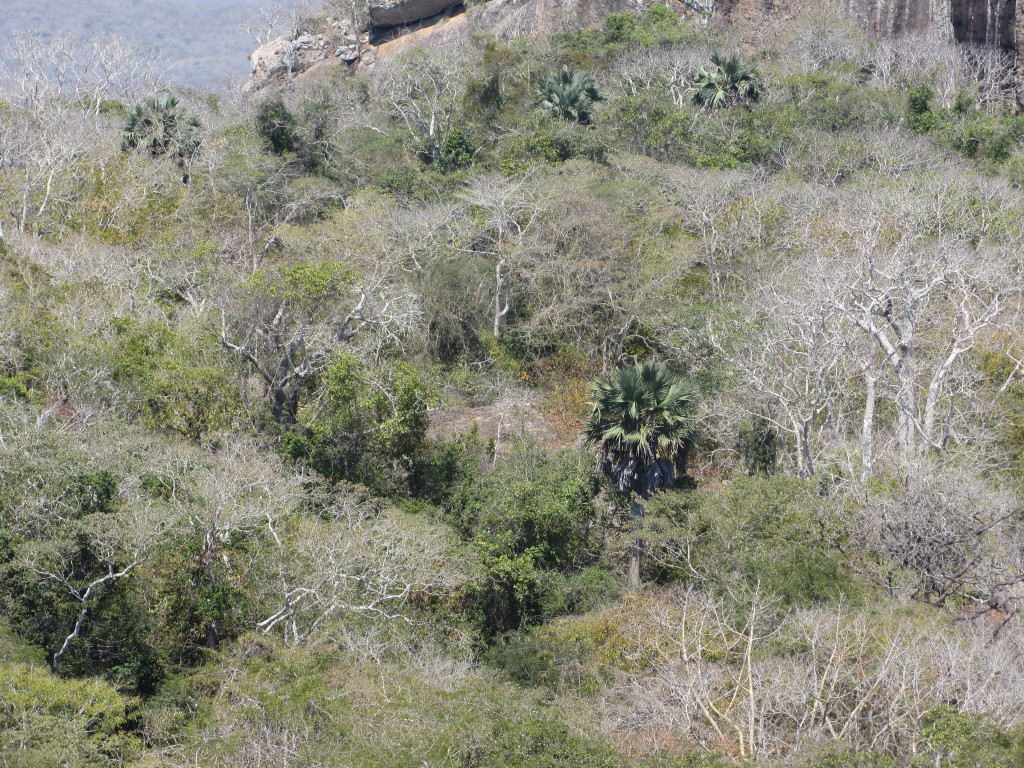
Deciduous forest on the Yoloko inselberg near Pemba, Mozambique

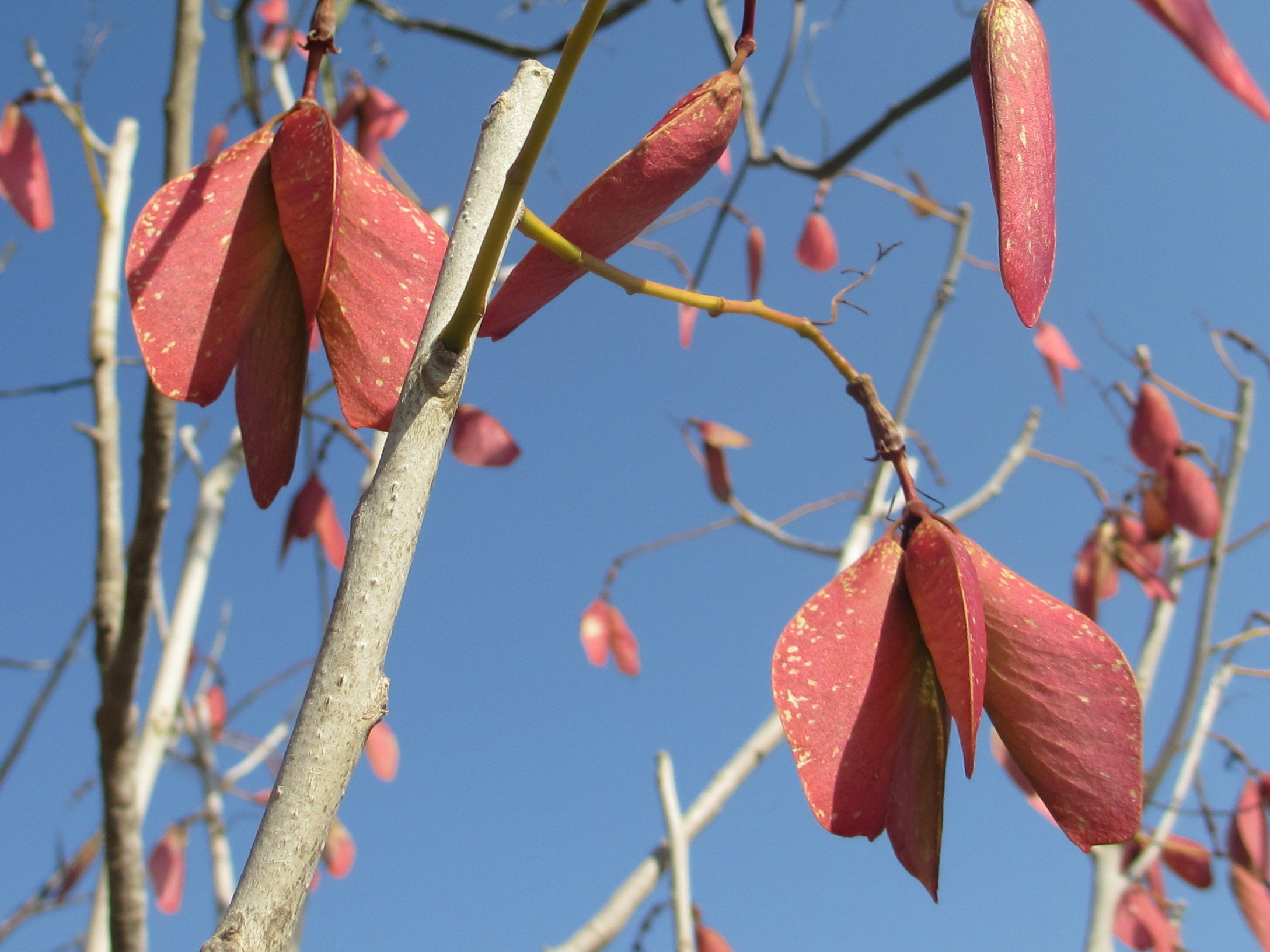
Hildegardia migeodii, Malvaceae, a rare endemic of these forests

== See also ==
- Arabuko Sokoke National Park
- KwaZulu-Cape coastal forest mosaic
- Maputaland coastal forest mosaic
