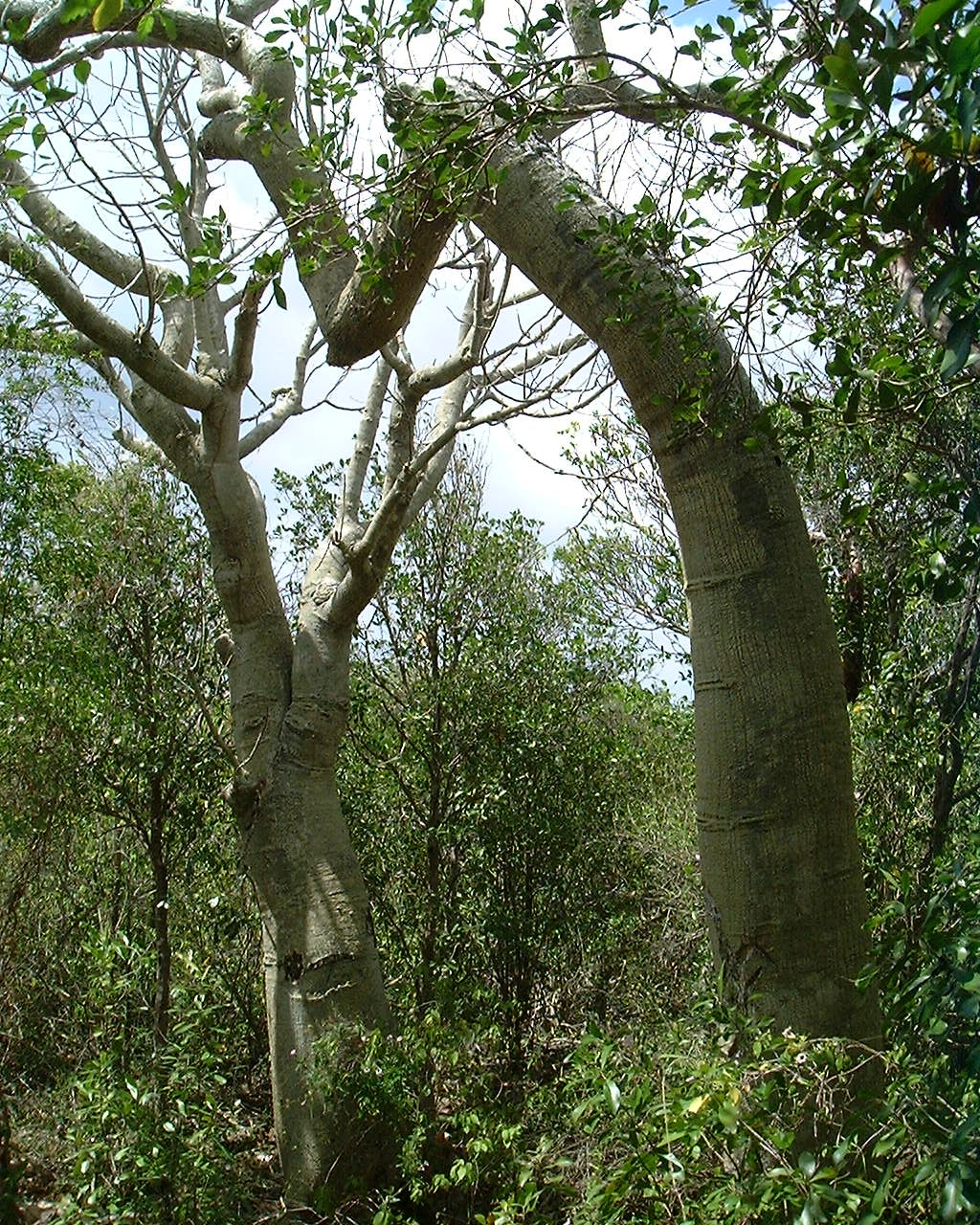
- H. cubensis trees during their deciduous phase

Conservation status
- Endangered (IUCN 3.1)

Scientific classification
- Kingdom: Plantae
- Clade: Tracheophytes
- Clade: Angiosperms
- Clade: Eudicots
- Clade: Rosids
- Order: Malvales
- Family: Malvaceae
- Genus: Hildegardia
- Species: H. cubensis

Binomial name
- Hildegardia cubensis (Urb.) Kosterm.

= Hildegardia cubensis =

Species of tree

Hildegardia cubensis is a species of flowering plant in the family Malvaceae (formerly Sterculiaceae). The species is endemic to Cuba, and is threatened by habitat loss. In Cuba it is commonly known as Guana.

Hildegardia cubensis was first described in Urban Symbollae Antillianae vol. IX using specimens collected by Ekman in the municipality of Calixto García, eastern Cuba.

== Description ==
Hildegardia cubensis is a large tree, perennial and deciduous, reaching heights up to 20 m (66 ft).The bark has a green to yellow-green colour and is fibrous and glabrous. Leaves are up to 20 cm (7.9 in) long and up to 19 cm (7.5 in) broad, tomentous, petioles up to 15 cm (5.9 in). The fresh flowers are orange-yellow, length of calyx is 10–12 mm (0.39–0.47 in), 5 lobes, stigmas spatulate. Blooming from February to April, having hermaphrodite and masculine flowers. Seeds in samaras.

== Uses ==
At the beginning of the 20th century large quantities of the precious wood were exported to Germany. The strong yellow bast was used to make sombreros and to bundle cigars. Due to its rareness, Hildegardia cubensis bast was substituted by raffia and similar palm leaves.

== Gallery ==
H. cubensis in cultivation at Fairchild Tropical Botanical Gardens

2015-0776 H. cubensis FTBG tag, Malvaceae Caribbean Jardin Bot Nacional de Cuba

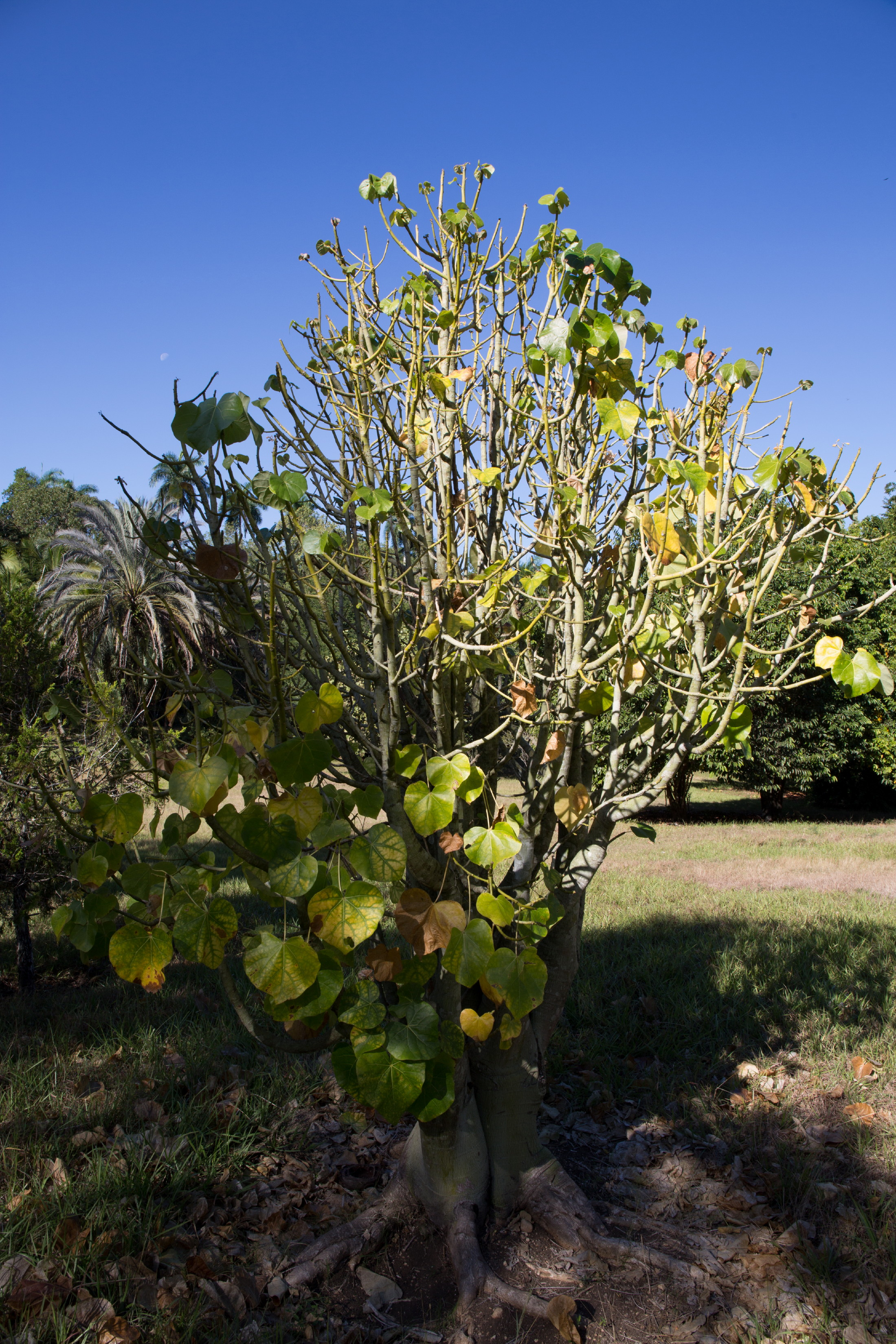
H. cubensis young tree

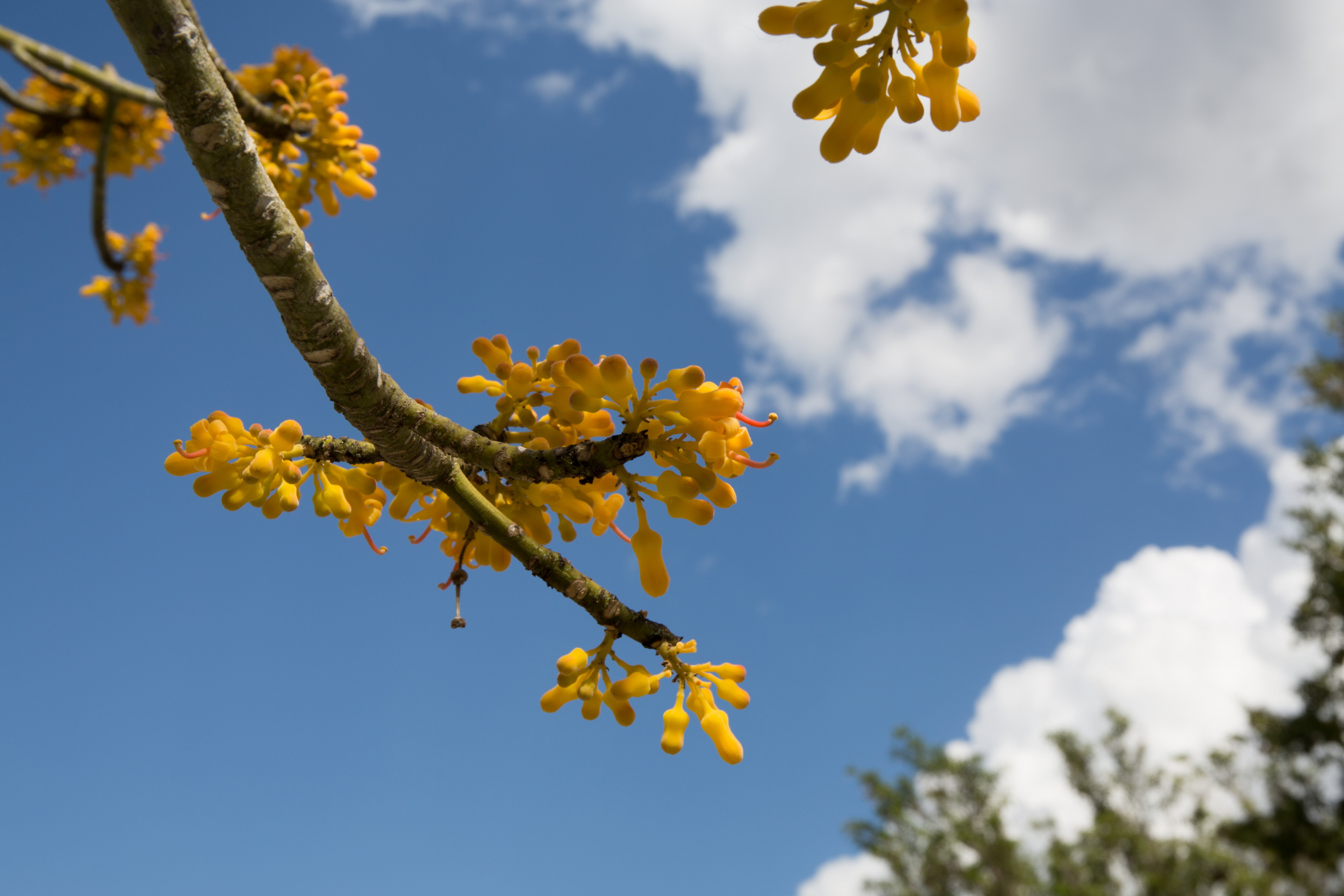
H. cubensis flowers

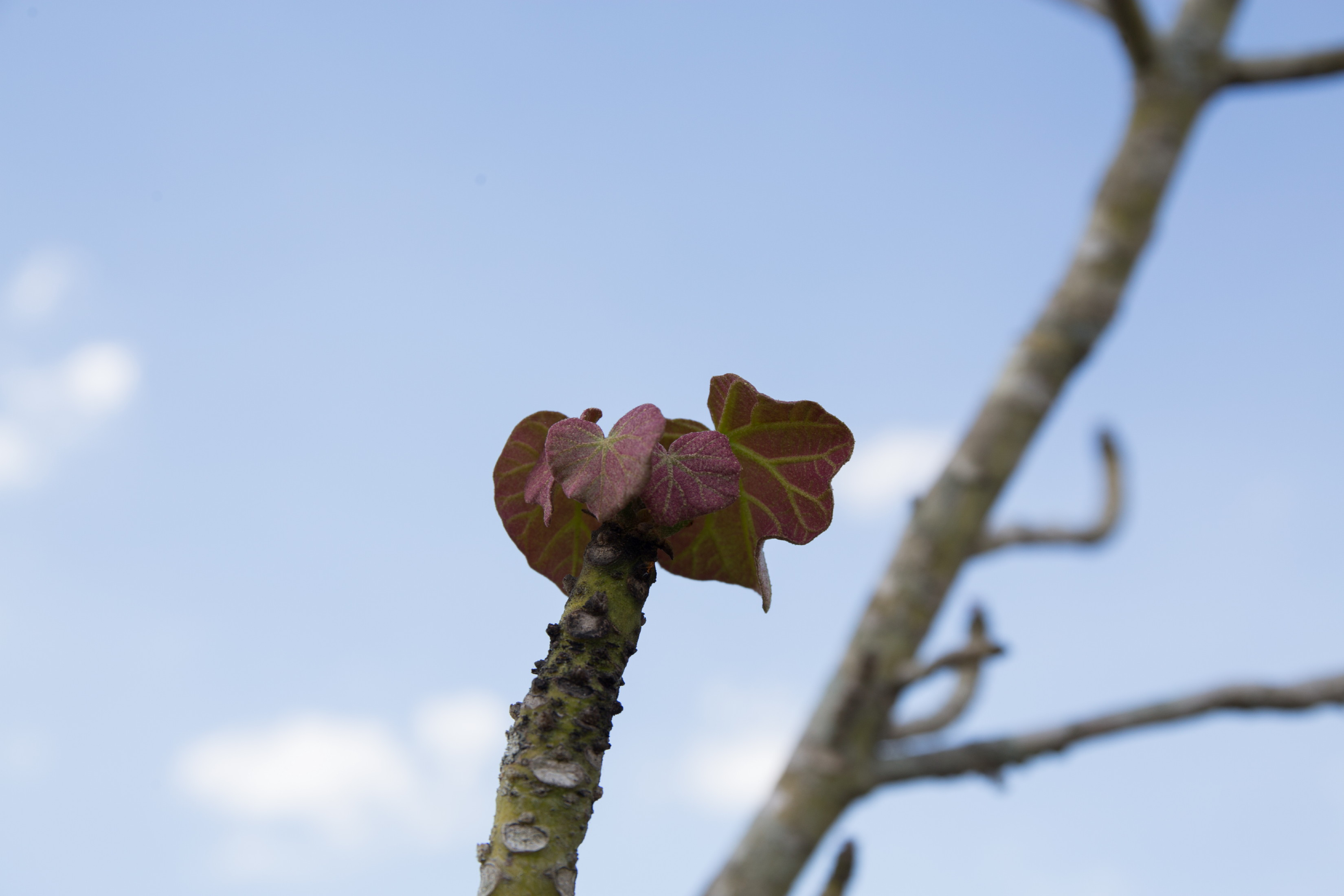
H. cubensis young leaves

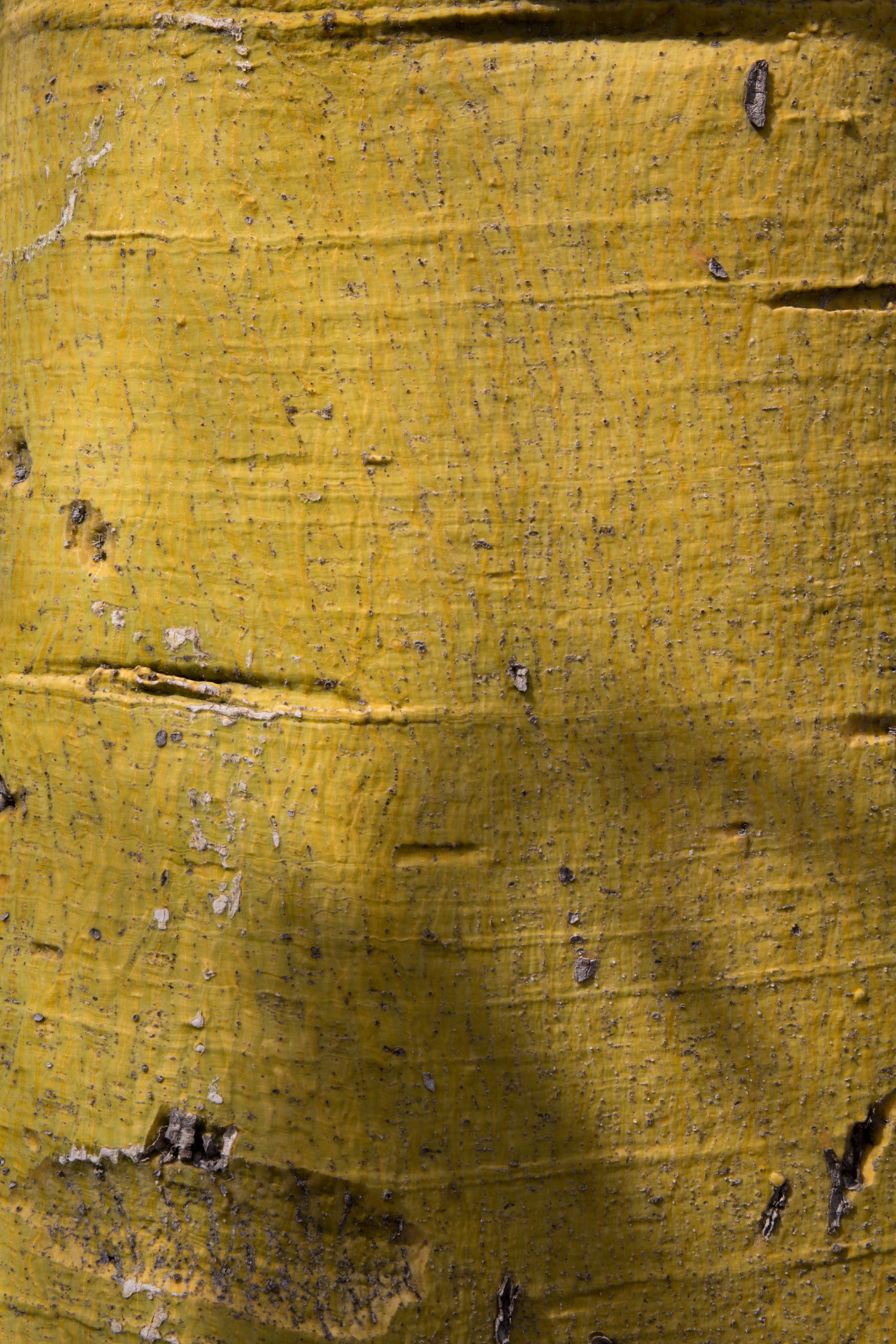
H. cubensis bark
