= Hildegardia gillettii =

Conservation status
- Endangered (IUCN 2.3)

Scientific classification
- Kingdom: Plantae
- Clade: Tracheophytes
- Clade: Angiosperms
- Clade: Eudicots
- Clade: Rosids
- Order: Malvales
- Family: Malvaceae
- Genus: Hildegardia
- Species: H. gillettii

Binomial name
- Hildegardia gillettii L.J.Dorr & L.C.Barnett

Species of flowering plant

Hildegardia gillettii is a species of flowering plant in the family Malvaceae. It is found only in Somalia, and is threatened by habitat loss.
