= Cameraria sokoke =

Scientific classification
- Kingdom: Animalia
- Phylum: Arthropoda
- Class: Insecta
- Order: Lepidoptera
- Family: Gracillariidae
- Genus: Cameraria
- Species: C. sokoke

Binomial name
- Cameraria sokoke de Prins, 2012

Species of moth

Cameraria sokoke is a moth of the family Gracillariidae. It is found in coastal forests of eastern Kenya.

The length of the forewings is about 1.9 millimetres (0.075 in).

== Etymology ==
The specific name sokoke refers to the type locality, the Arabuko Sokoke Forest in eastern Kenya, where the holotype was collected.
