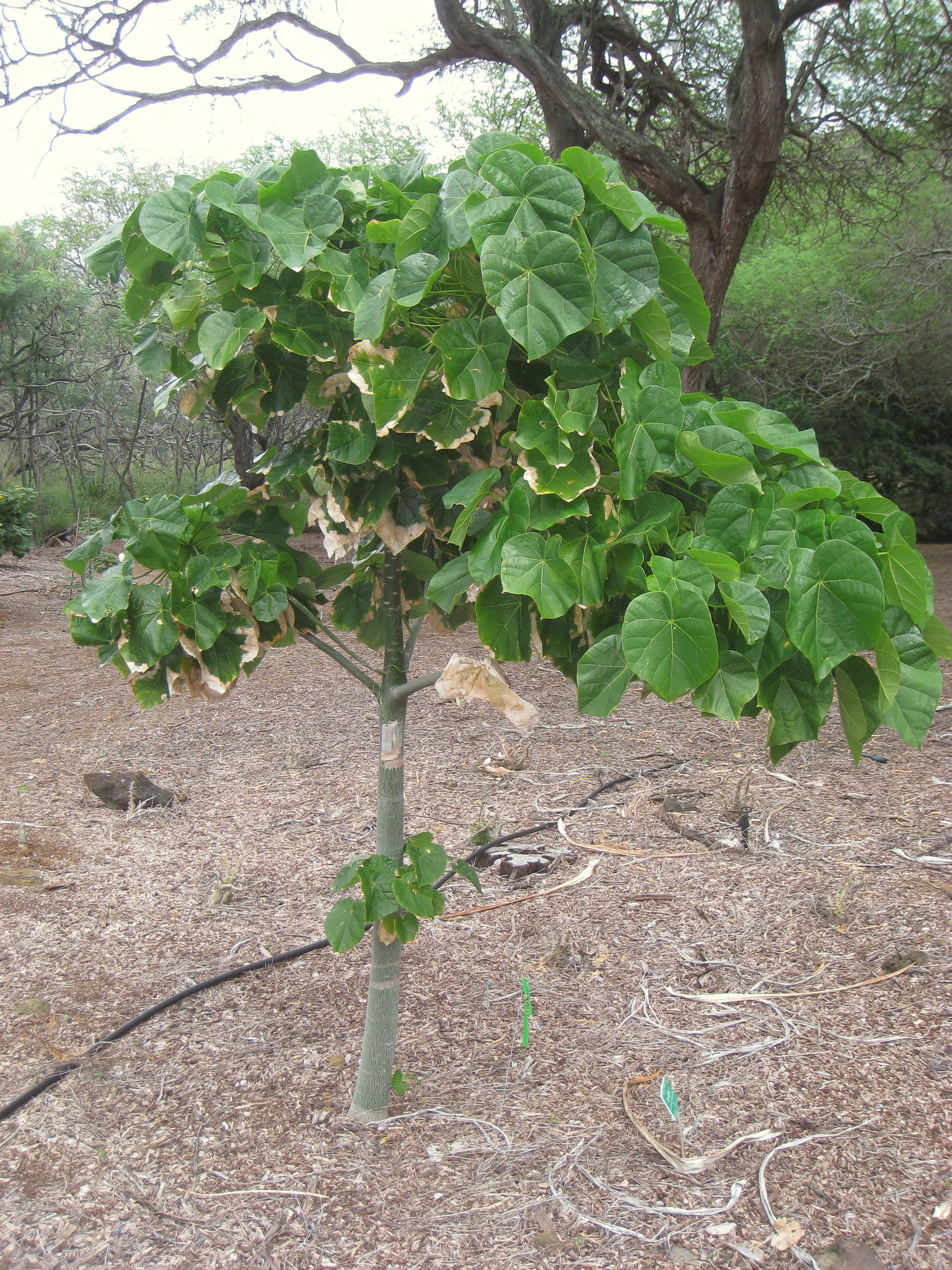
- Hildegardia barteri

Scientific classification
- Kingdom: Plantae
- Clade: Tracheophytes
- Clade: Angiosperms
- Clade: Eudicots
- Clade: Rosids
- Order: Malvales
- Family: Malvaceae
- Subfamily: Sterculioideae
- Genus: Hildegardia; Schott & Endl.

= Hildegardia (plant) =

Genus of flowering plants

Hildegardia is a genus of trees in the family Malvaceae. The genus includes 12 species with a pantropical distribution.

In older systems of classification, it was placed in Sterculiaceae, but all members of that family are now in an expanded Malvaceae. The genus is named for Saint Hildegard of Bingen due to her contributions to herbal medicine.

== Species ==
Twelve species are accepted.

- Hildegardia ankaranensis (Arènes) Kosterm.
- Hildegardia australensis G.Leach & M.Cheek (1991)
- Hildegardia barteri (Mast.) Kosterm.
- Hildegardia cubensis (Urb.) Kosterm. – Guana, guanabaum
- Hildegardia dauphinensis J.G.Zaborsky
- Hildegardia erythrosiphon (Baill.) Kosterm.
- Hildegardia gillettii L.J.Dorr & L.C.Barnett (1990)
- Hildegardia merrittii (Merrill) Kosterm.
- Hildegardia migeodii (Exell) Kosterm.
- Hildegardia perrieri (Hochr.) Arènes
- Hildegardia populifolia (DC.) Schott & Endl.
- Hildegardia sundaica Kosterm.
