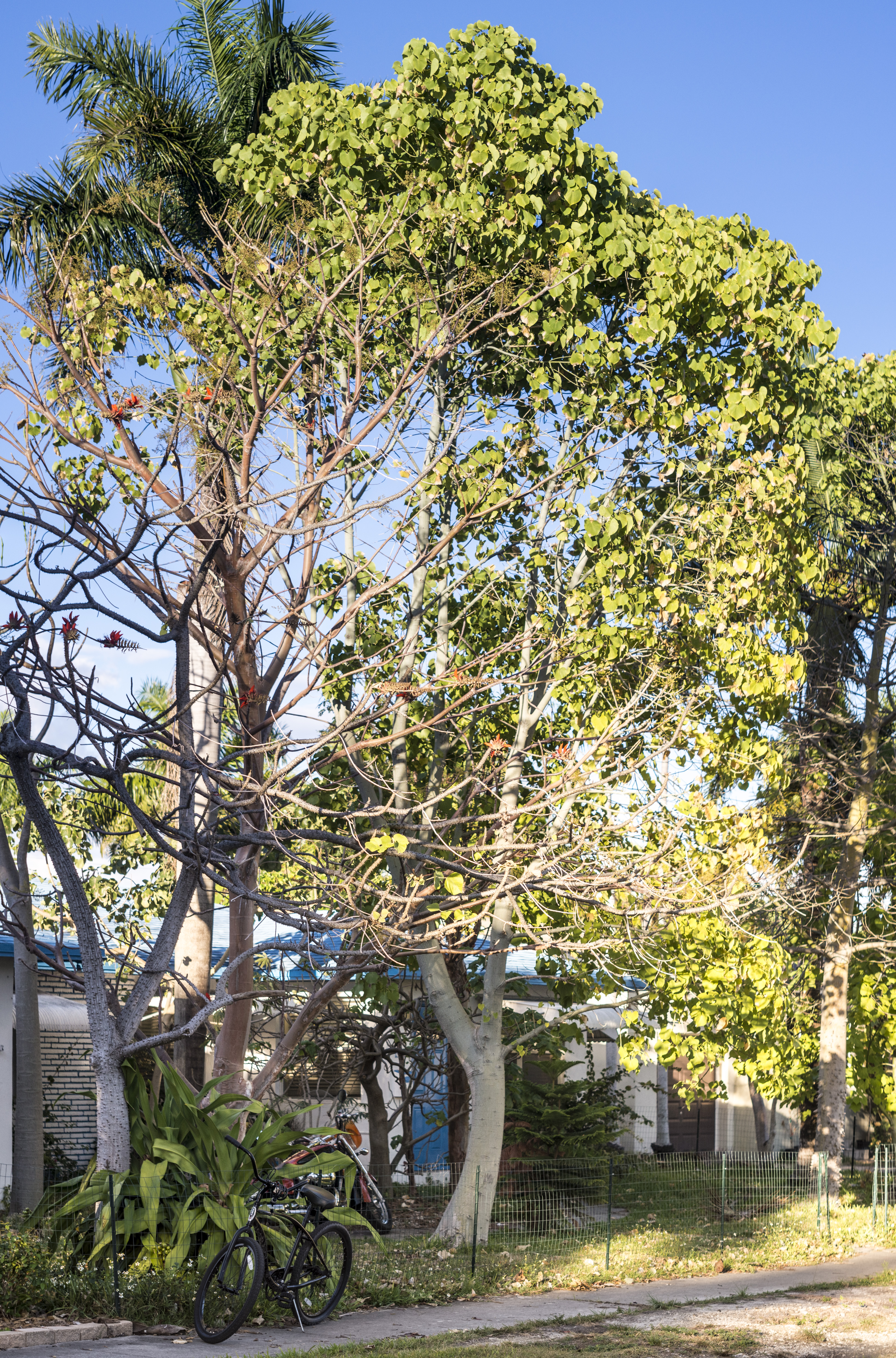
- In Hollywood, Florida, USA

Conservation status
- Near Threatened (IUCN 3.1)

Scientific classification
- Kingdom: Plantae
- Clade: Tracheophytes
- Clade: Angiosperms
- Clade: Eudicots
- Clade: Rosids
- Order: Malvales
- Family: Malvaceae
- Genus: Hildegardia
- Species: H. populifolia

Binomial name
- Hildegardia populifolia (Roxb.) Schott & Endl.

Synonyms
- Clompanus populifolia Kuntze; Firmiana populifolia Terrac.; Hildegardia candolleana Steud.; Hildegardia candollei Schott & Endl.; Sterculia populifolia Roxb. & Wall.

= Hildegardia populifolia =

Species of flowering plant

Hildegardia populifolia is a species of flowering plant in the family Malvaceae. It native to in India: in the Eastern Ghats of Andhra Pradesh and Tamil Nadu and also in Karnataka. It is threatened by habitat loss.

This is a deciduous tree growing up to 20 meters tall. It has lobed leaves and panicles of flowers with red sepals and no petals. Most trees produce both male and bisexual flowers.

The bee Trigona iridipennis feeds on the pollen and nectar. The flowers are visited by several bird species, such as the red-vented bulbul (Pycnonotus cafer), rufous-backed shrike (Lanius schach), blue-tailed bee-eater (Merops philippinus), and stork-billed kingfisher (Pelargopsis capensis), some of which are predators of the bee.

== Gallery ==
H. populifolia in cultivation Fairchild Tropical Botanical Garden

H. populifolia bisexual flower

H. populifolia male flower
