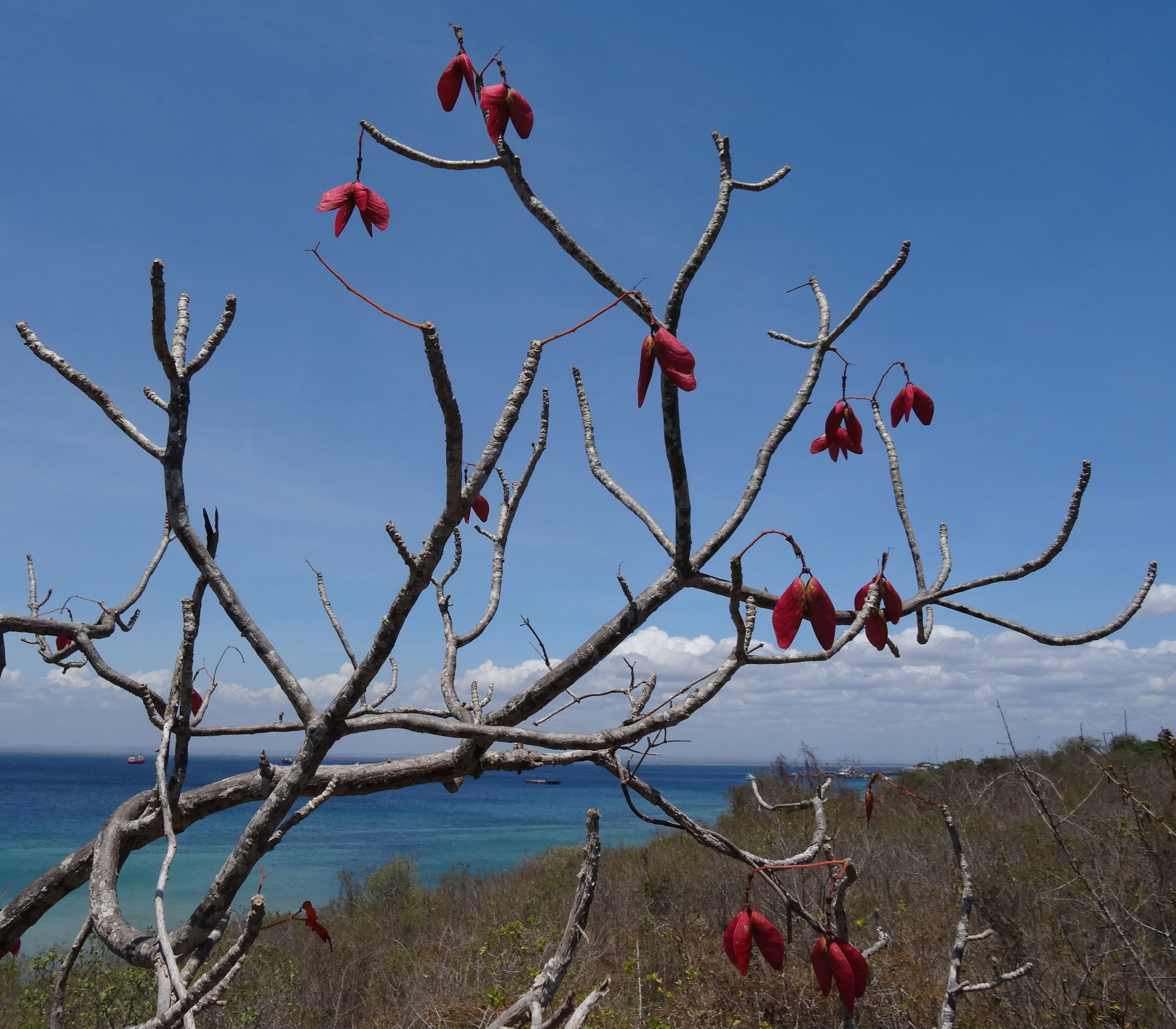
- H. migeodii at Pemba Bay, with inflated, single to 5-follicled samaras

Conservation status
- Endangered (IUCN 3.1)

Scientific classification
- Kingdom: Plantae
- Clade: Tracheophytes
- Clade: Angiosperms
- Clade: Eudicots
- Clade: Rosids
- Order: Malvales
- Family: Malvaceae
- Genus: Hildegardia
- Species: H. migeodii

Binomial name
- Hildegardia migeodii (Exell) Kosterm.

Synonyms
- Erythropsis migeodii (Exell) Ridl.; Firmiana migeodii Exell

= Hildegardia migeodii =

Species of flowering plant

Hildegardia migeodii is a species of flowering plant in the family Malvaceae. The deciduous shrub or smallish tree is an uncommon to rare endemic to the coastal forests region of eastern Africa.

== Range and habitat ==
It occurs locally from southern Tanzania to southern Mozambique. It has been found up to 250 m, or locally to 700 m a.s.l., in forest fringes, woodland and wooded grassland.

== Gallery ==
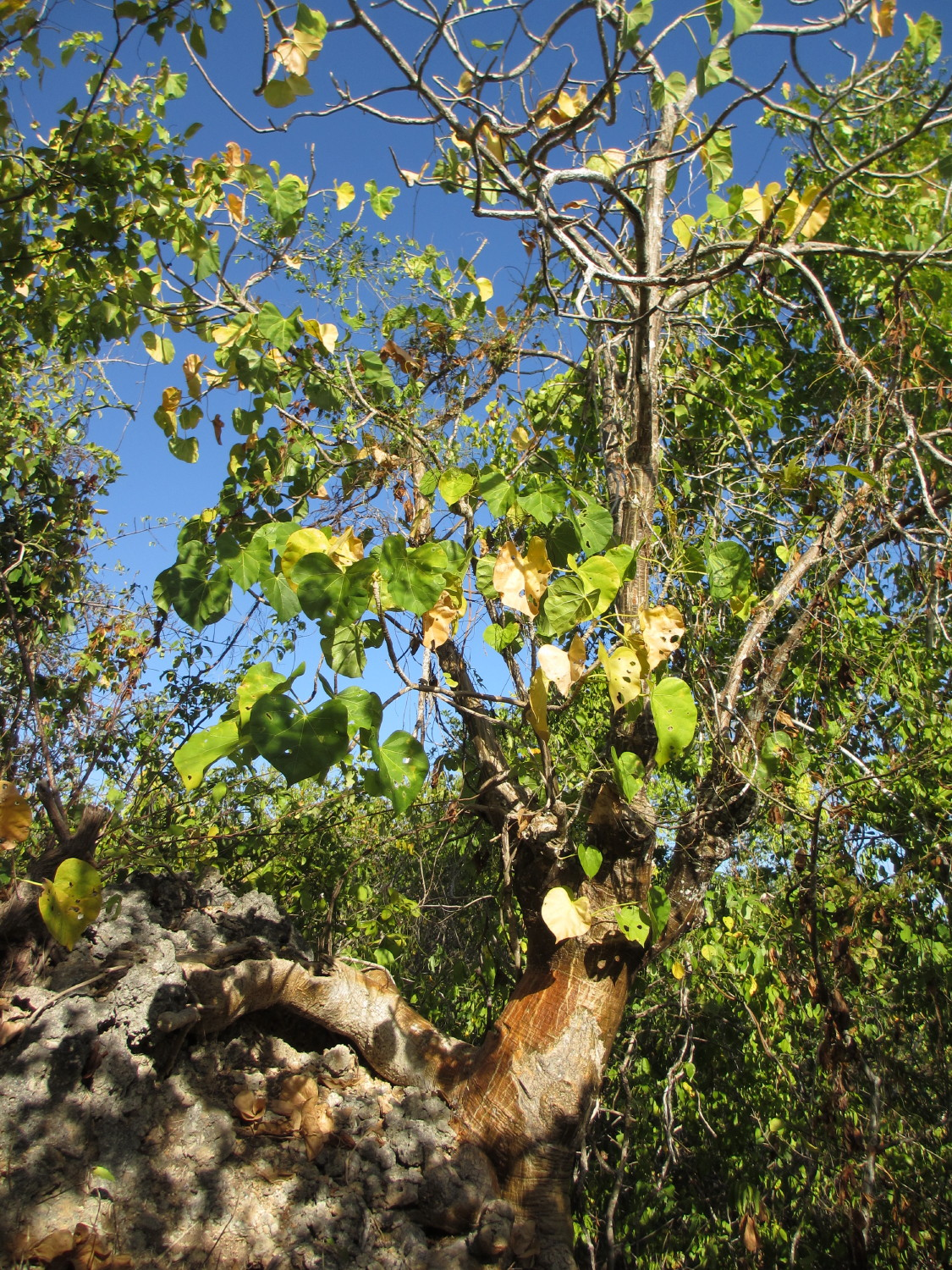
habit

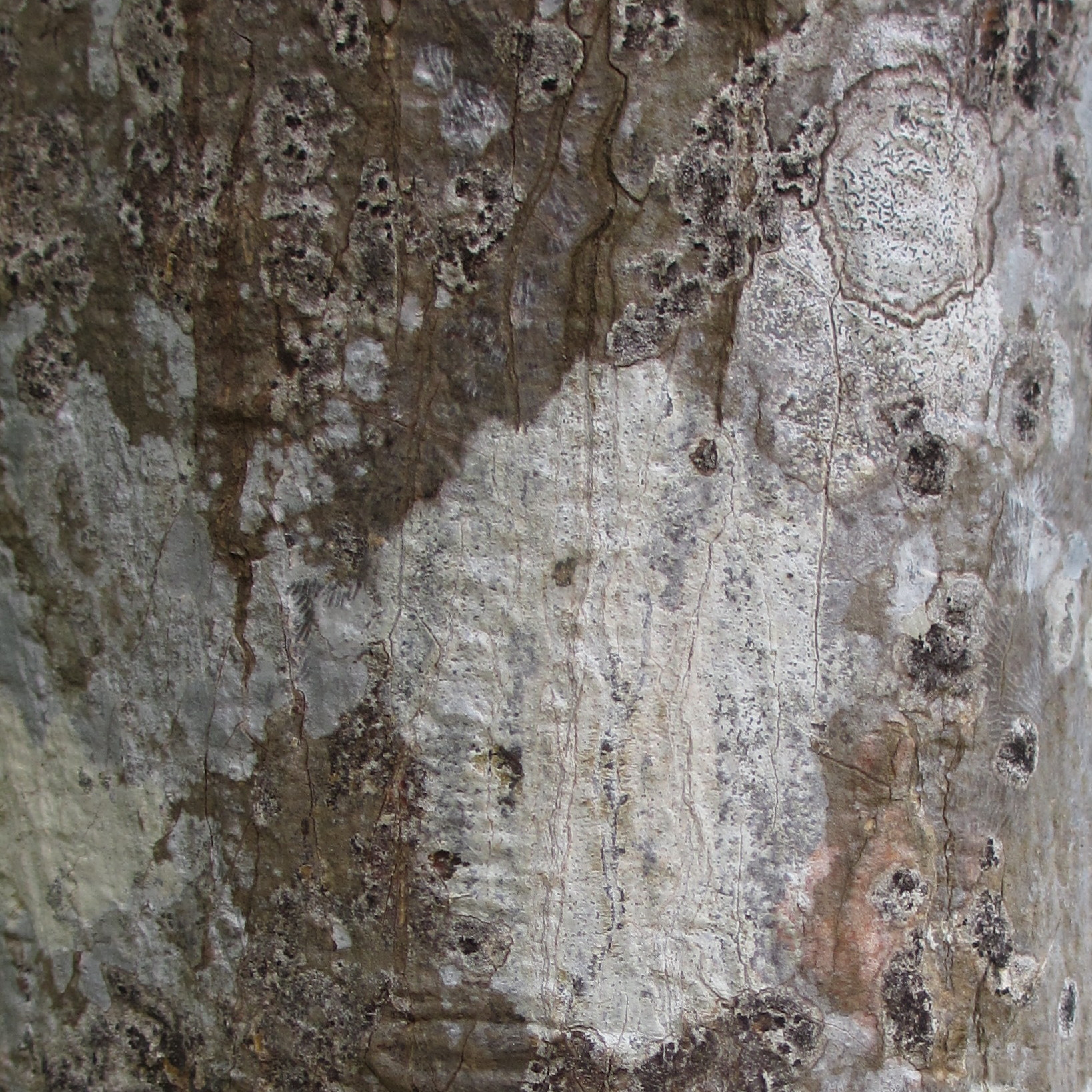
bark texture

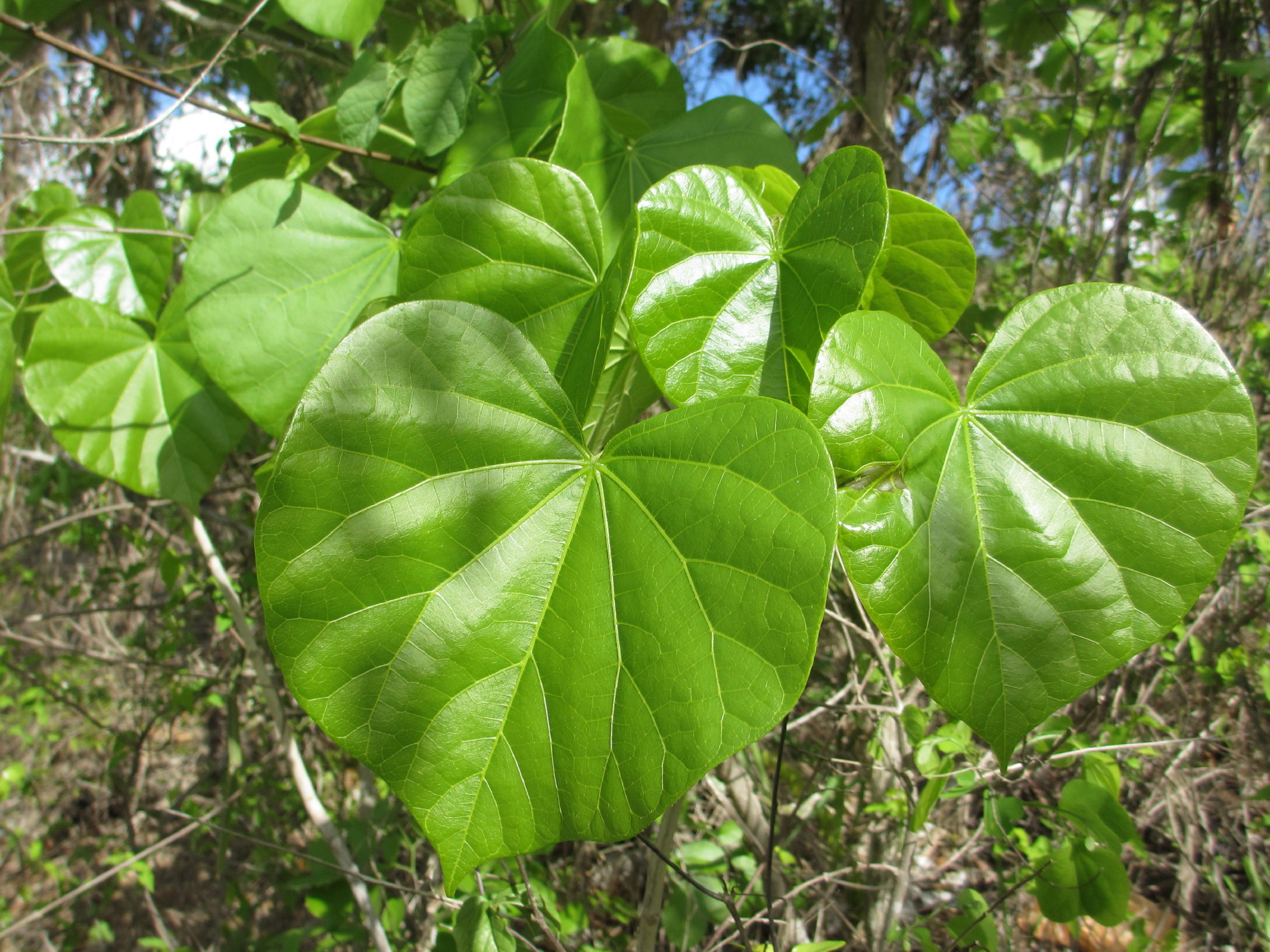
shiny, cordate leaves

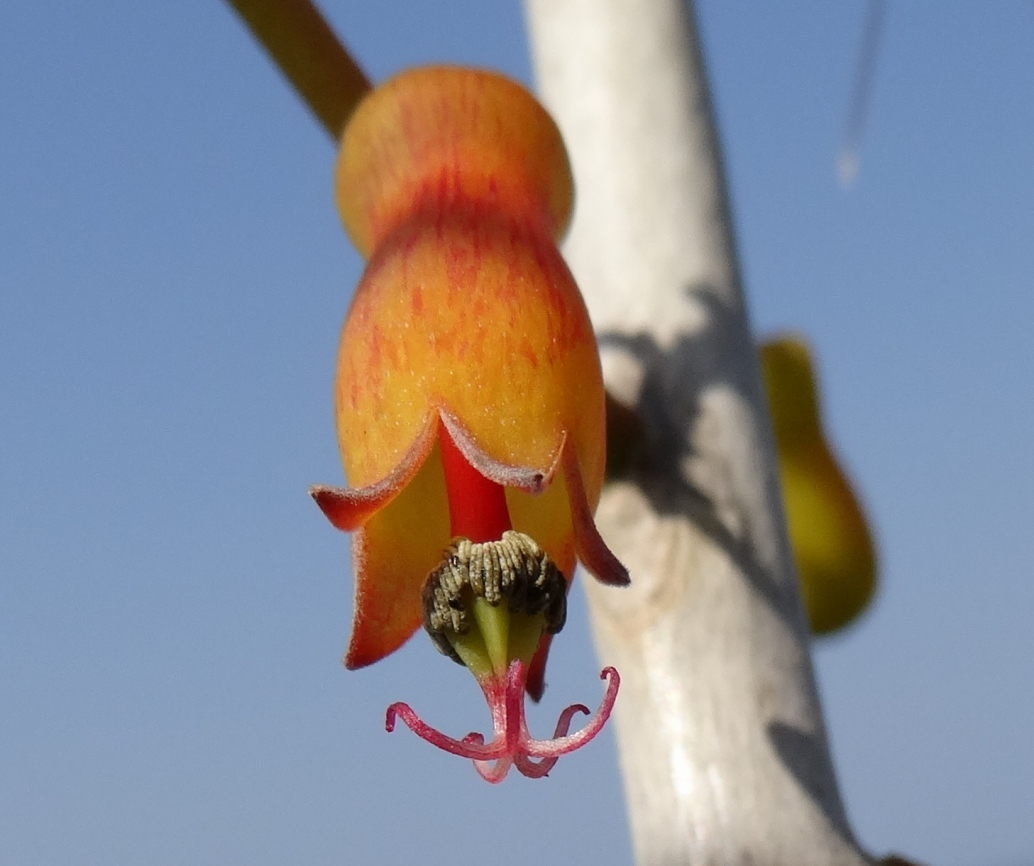
pistillate flower

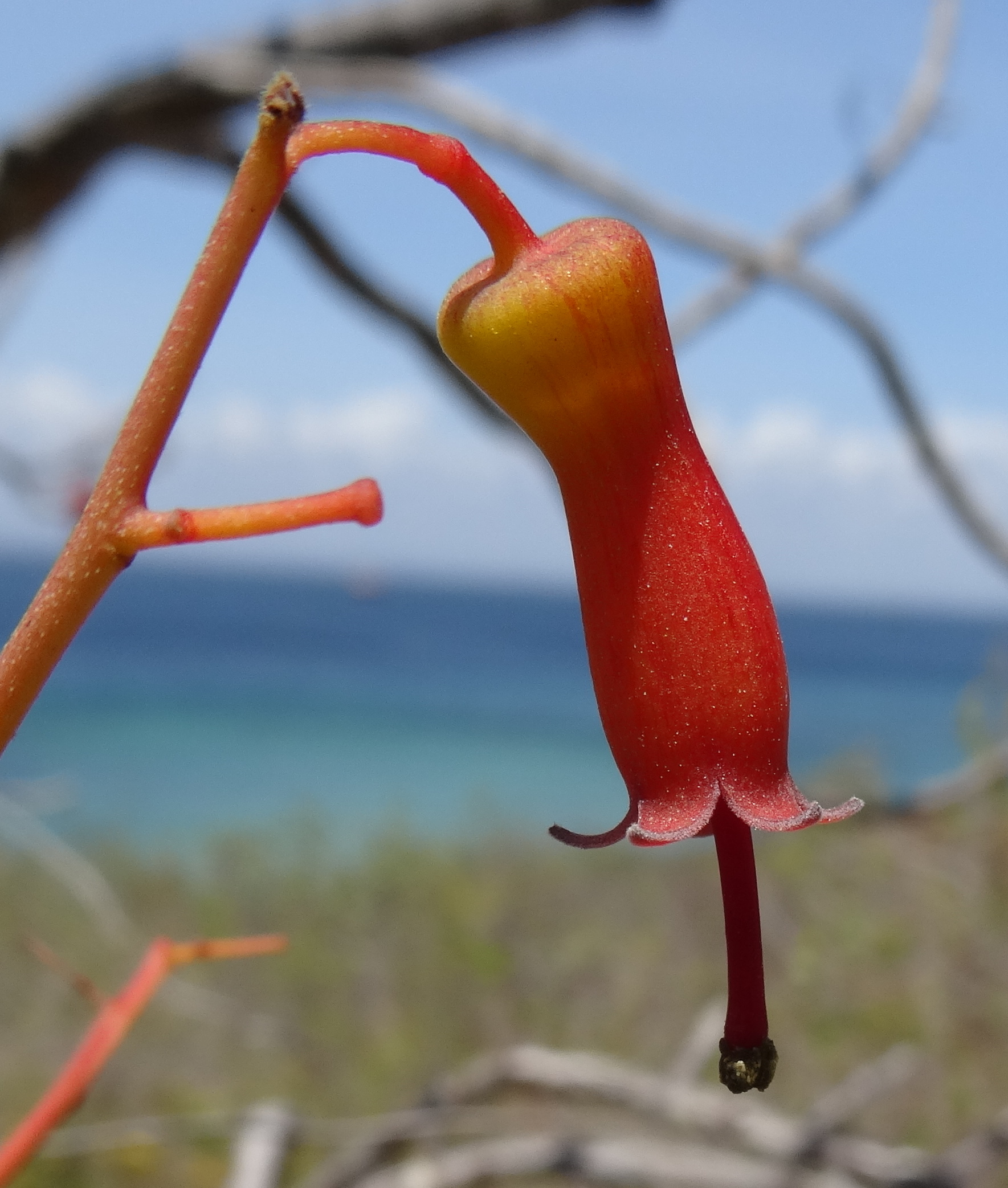
staminate flower

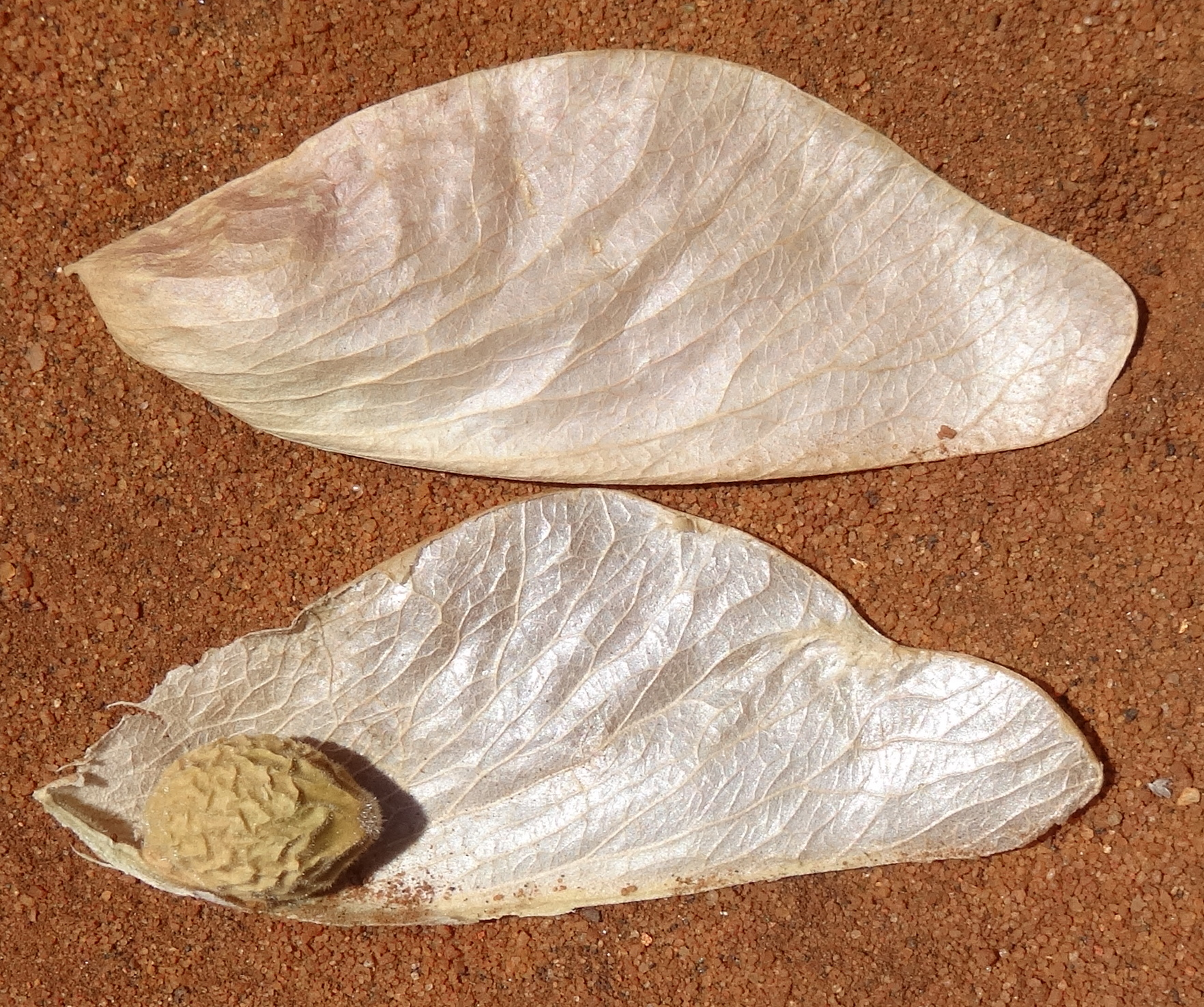
An opened desiccated follicle of the samara containing one seed
