= Hildegardia erythrosiphon =

Conservation status
- Least Concern (IUCN 3.1)

Scientific classification
- Kingdom: Plantae
- Clade: Tracheophytes
- Clade: Angiosperms
- Clade: Eudicots
- Clade: Rosids
- Order: Malvales
- Family: Malvaceae
- Genus: Hildegardia
- Species: H. erythrosiphon

Binomial name
- Hildegardia erythrosiphon (Baill.) Kosterm.

Synonyms
- Erythropsis erythrosiphon (Baill.) Ridl.; Sterculia erythrosiphon Baill.; Tarrietia erythrosiphon (Baill.) Hochr.

Species of flowering plant

Hildegardia erythrosiphon is a species of flowering plant in the family Malvaceae. The species is endemic to the east and south of Madagascar. There are 37 known subpopulations. The species has been assessed as least concern by the International Union for Conservation of Nature.

There are 3 accepted subspecies, 4 accepted varieties, and 1 accepted subvariety:

- Hildegardia erythrosiphon subsp. dolichocalyx (Arènes) Arènes
- Hildegardia erythrosiphon subsp. eriocalyx (Arènes) Arènes
- Hildegardia erythrosiphon subsp. erythrosiphon (Baill.) Kosterm.
- Hildegardia erythrosiphon var. alluaudiana (Arènes) Arènes
- Hildegardia erythrosiphon var. analamerensis (Arènes) Arènes
- Hildegardia erythrosiphon var. antsiranensis (Arènes) Arènes
- Hildegardia erythrosiphon var. onilahensis (Arènes) Arènes
- Hildegardia erythrosiphon var. urschiana (Arènes) Arènes
- Hildegardia erythrosiphon subvar. ankazoabensis (Arènes) Arènes
