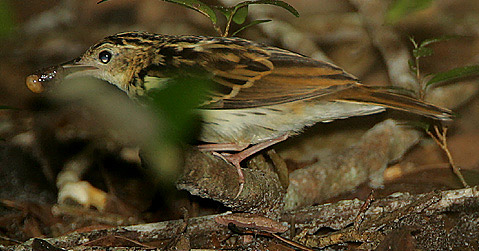
- Sokoke pipit feeding on a snail on the forest floor

Conservation status
- Endangered (IUCN 3.1)

Scientific classification
- Kingdom: Animalia
- Phylum: Chordata
- Class: Aves
- Order: Passeriformes
- Family: Motacillidae
- Genus: Anthus
- Species: A. sokokensis

Binomial name
- Anthus sokokensis Van Someren, 1921

= Sokoke pipit =

Species of bird

The Sokoke pipit (Anthus sokokensis) is a species of bird in the family Motacillidae. It is found in Kenya and Tanzania. Its natural habitat is subtropical or tropical moist lowland forests. It is threatened by habitat loss. It has richly coloured upperparts, prominent pale wingbars, and a heavily streaked breast.
