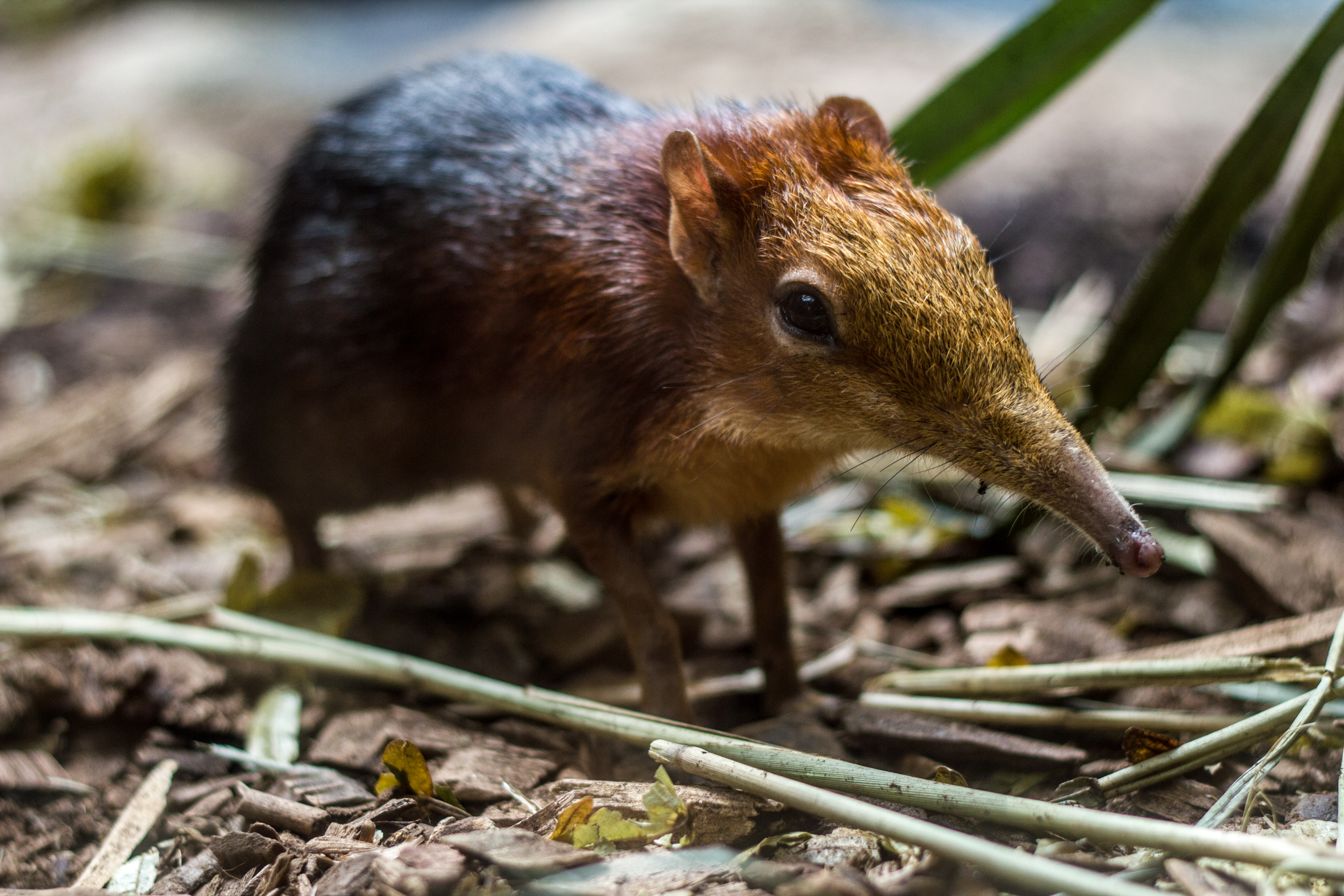
- Rhynchocyon petersi

Scientific classification
- Kingdom: Animalia
- Phylum: Chordata
- Class: Mammalia
- Order: Macroscelidea
- Family: Macroscelididae
- Genus: Rhynchocyon; Peters, 1847

Type species
- Rhynchocyon cirnei Peters, 1847

Species
- Rhynchocyon chrysopygus Rhynchocyon cirnei Rhynchocyon petersi Rhynchocyon stuhlmanni Rhynchocyon udzungwensis

= Rhynchocyon =

Genus of mammals

Rhynchocyon is a genus of sengis in the family Macroscelididae. Members of this genus are known colloquially as giant sengis. They are a ground-dwelling mammal, significantly larger than their relatives in the order Macroscelidea that live primarily in dense forests across eastern Africa. Habitats range from eastern Africa's coastal forests, Rift Valley highlands, and the Congo basin. The species is widely threatened, with two of four assessed by the International Union for Conservation of Nature's Red List of Threatened Species. Habitat fragmentation from the growth of human settlements and activities are the primary threats to their populations. The genus contains the following five species and several subspecies:

- Golden-rumped sengi, Rhynchocyon chrysopygus
  - Rhynchocyon chrysopygus mandelai
- Chequered sengi, Rhynchocyon cirnei
  - Rhynchocyon cirnei shirensis
  - Rhynchocyon cirnei reichardi
  - Rhynchocyon cirnei hendersoni
  - Rhynchocyon cirnei macrurus
- Black and rufous sengi, Rhynchocyon petersi
  - Rhynchocyon petersi adersi
- Stuhlmann's sengi, Rhynchocyon stuhlmanni
- Grey-faced sengi, Rhynchocyon udzungwensis

Cladogram of living Rhynchocyon species

- Rhynchocyon
  - R. chrysopygus
  - - - R. stuhlmanni
      - R. cirnei
    - - R. udzungwensis
      - R. petersi

== Biology and ecology ==
The giant sengis are endemic to Africa, and usually live in lowland montane and dense forests, often "avoiding" edges of forest patches. These dense forests play a role in their shelter and reproduction, as they provide the ecological niche in which sengis exploit. They are typically active in the day (diurnal), spending their nights hidden in the shelters that they build the morning prior. After a few nights of use, sengis tend to abandon their shelters to create new ones elsewhere. They typically build their shelters at ground level, requiring dry leaf litter. The primary structure of a nest for R. udzungwensis, for example, consists of the excavation of a cup-like indentation in the soil, layered with leaves, and then covered with looser leaves as a roof covering. They usually construct their nests at the base of trees. They also use hollowed, fallen trees or trunks to retreat in shelter, especially when faced with predation. Sengis respond to disturbances by staying still or making loud thumping noises on the forest floor. In instances of predation, the giant sengi uses a half-bound gait to rapidly run away.

Other Macroscelidea species are known to bask in the sun, as a method of thermoregulation to save energy. Giant sengis do not bask—and it is most likely due to their adaptation to shaded canopy forest environments.

Sengis live in monogamous pairs, defending hectare-sized territories. Pairs spend little time together except when the female is in estrous. Mating occurs quickly and offspring grow quickly with minimal parental investment—none of which is paternal.

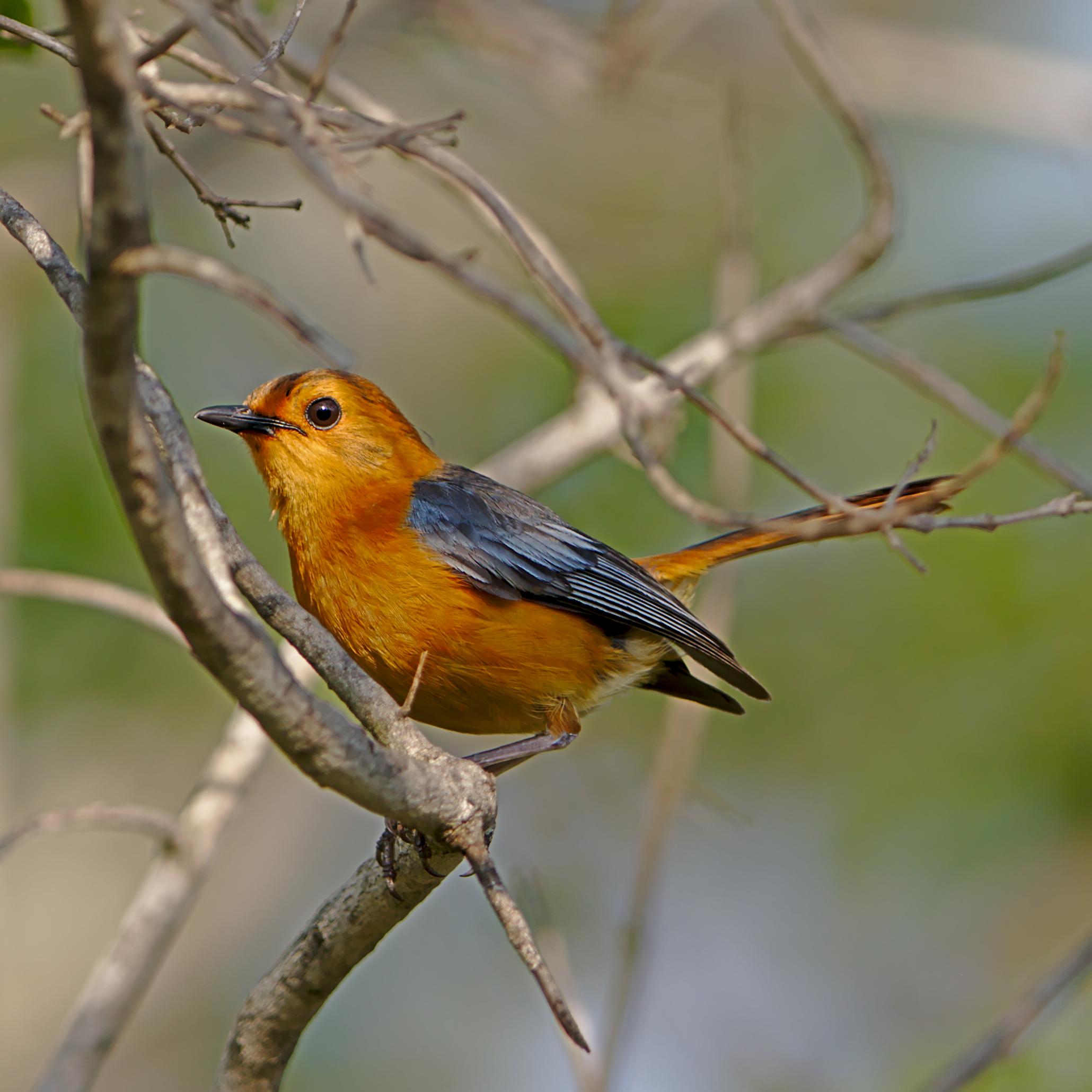
Red-capped robin-chat

It has been observed that the genus has a commensal relationship with a variety of ground-foraging birds throughout its ranges. Both the Red-capped robin-chat and White-chested alethe often follow the giant sengis as they forage, in attempt at capturing prey that is disturbed while they shuffle through leaf litter looking for prey. They eat primarily insects such as beetles, termites, ants, and centipedes, using their proboscises to dig them from the soil and its tongue to lick them up. Their facial morphology limits their diets to tiny invertebrates, and unlike other members of Macroscelidea, do not supplement their diet with foods such as nuts or small fruits.

=== Identification ===
Each species exhibits distinct and varying coat patterns and colors. Species and subspecies found in denser forests exhibit darker coloration and patterns while open woodland species exhibit lighter, chequers. The darker species R. petersi, R. chrysopygus, and R. udzungwensis still contain vestigial chequers, but are masked by the blended dark fur between them. This makes coat patterns an unreliable indicator of species delineation though useful for identification. The species are described as follows:

- R. chrysopygus exhibits a bright yellow patch of fur on its rump with very little black coloration at all. R. chrysopygus has a unique dermal shield (a specialized thickening of skin) on its rump.
- R. petersi has mostly orange-rufous coloration on its feet, ears, tail, chest, and on its face. Black fur extends from its rump and thighs up to its shoulders. Subspecies R. p. adersi has the same pelage.
- R. udzungwensis has black feet, ears and a tail. Its face is griseous grey with its lower rump and thighs are black. The chest is pale yellow.
- R. cirnei and its subspecies feature six dark-colored stripes and spots (chequers) on its back. They contain little to no black fur, are lighter in color, and differ markedly by their lack of orange-rufous coloration found on its coastal relatives R. petersi, R. chrysopygus, and R. udzungwensis. The subspecies R. c. macrurus exhibits a clinal variation different from coastal populations towards inland populations (being darker on the coast and lighter inland).
- R. stuhlmanni exhibits a similar coloration and pattern as R. cirnei differing notably by its white tail. Populations get darker to the east and lighter to the west in a cline.

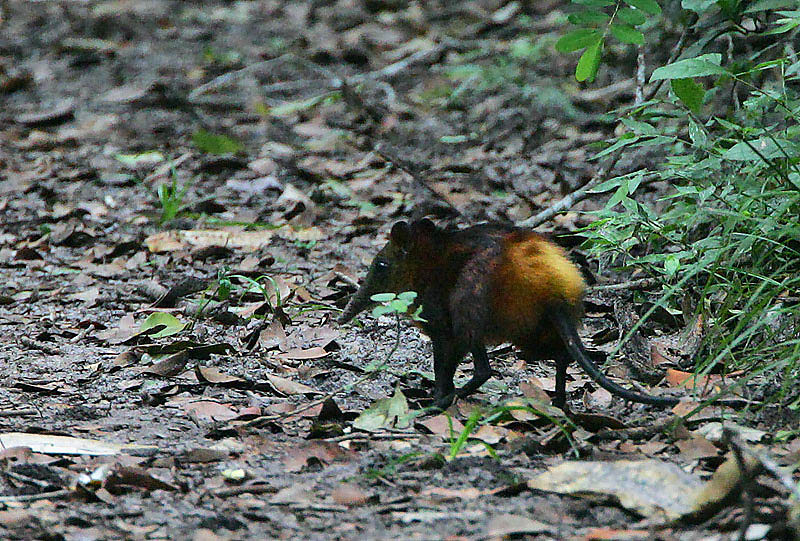
Rhynchocyon chrysopygus

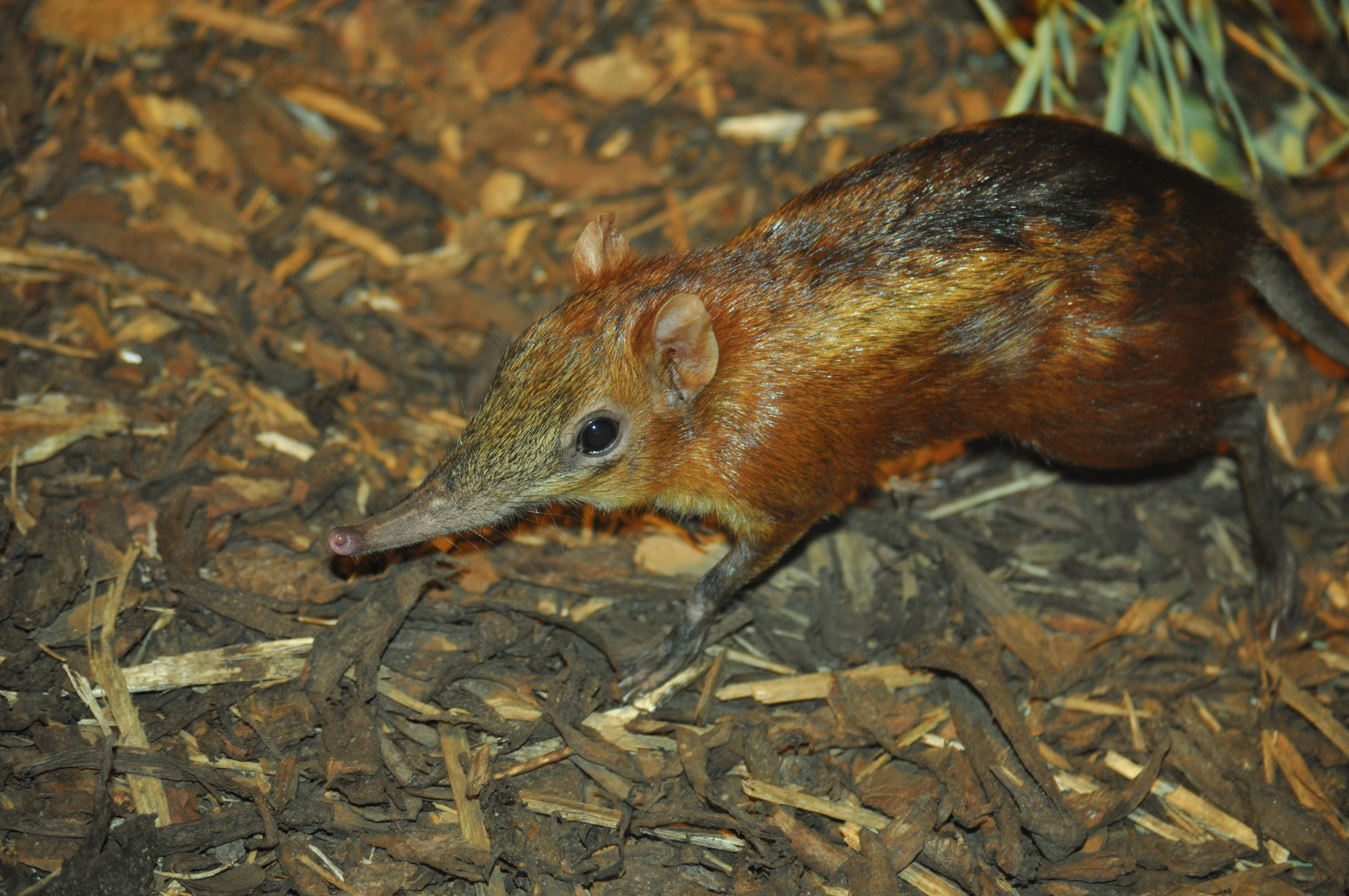
Rhynchocyon cirnei

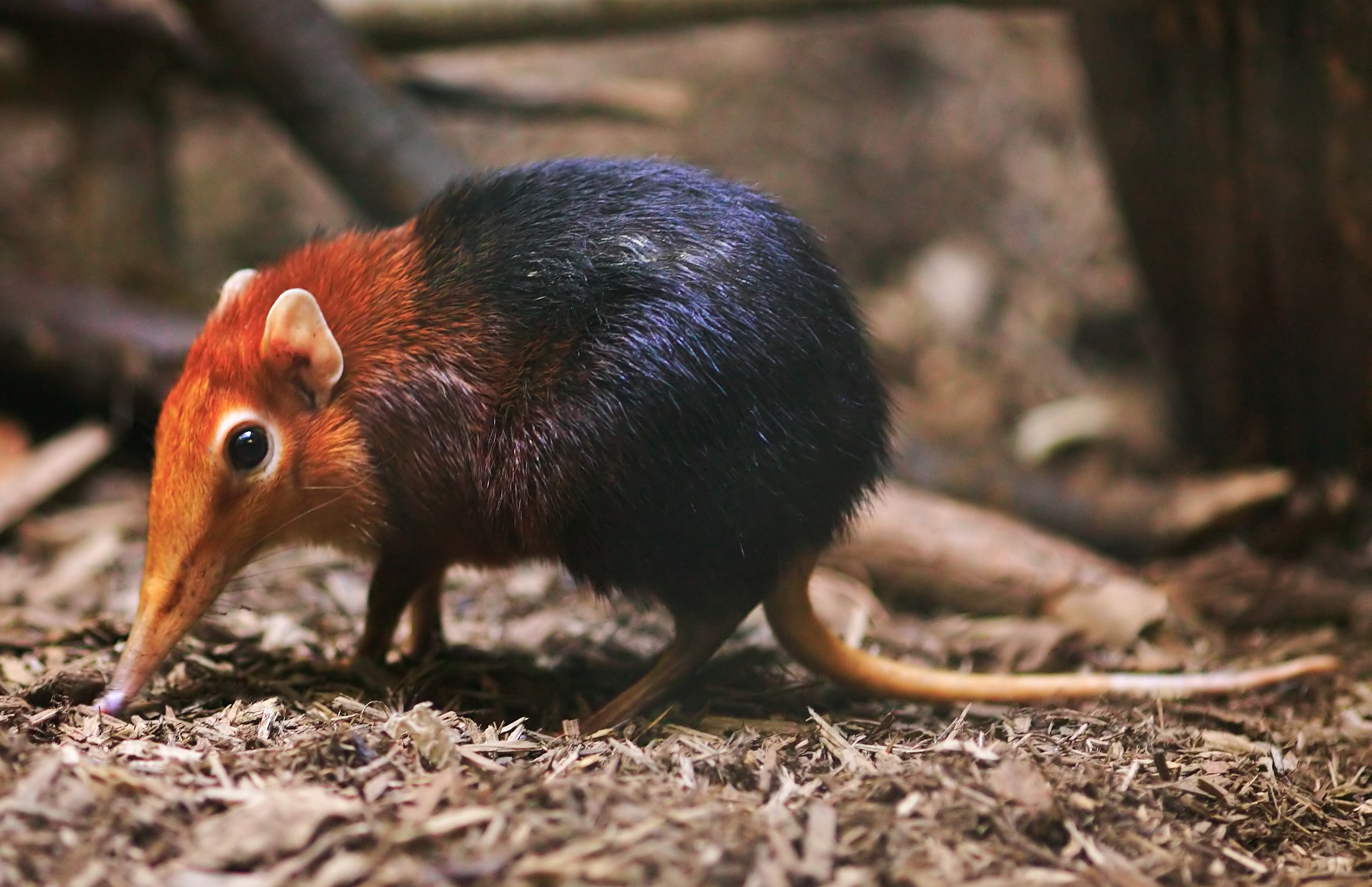
Rhynchocyon petersi

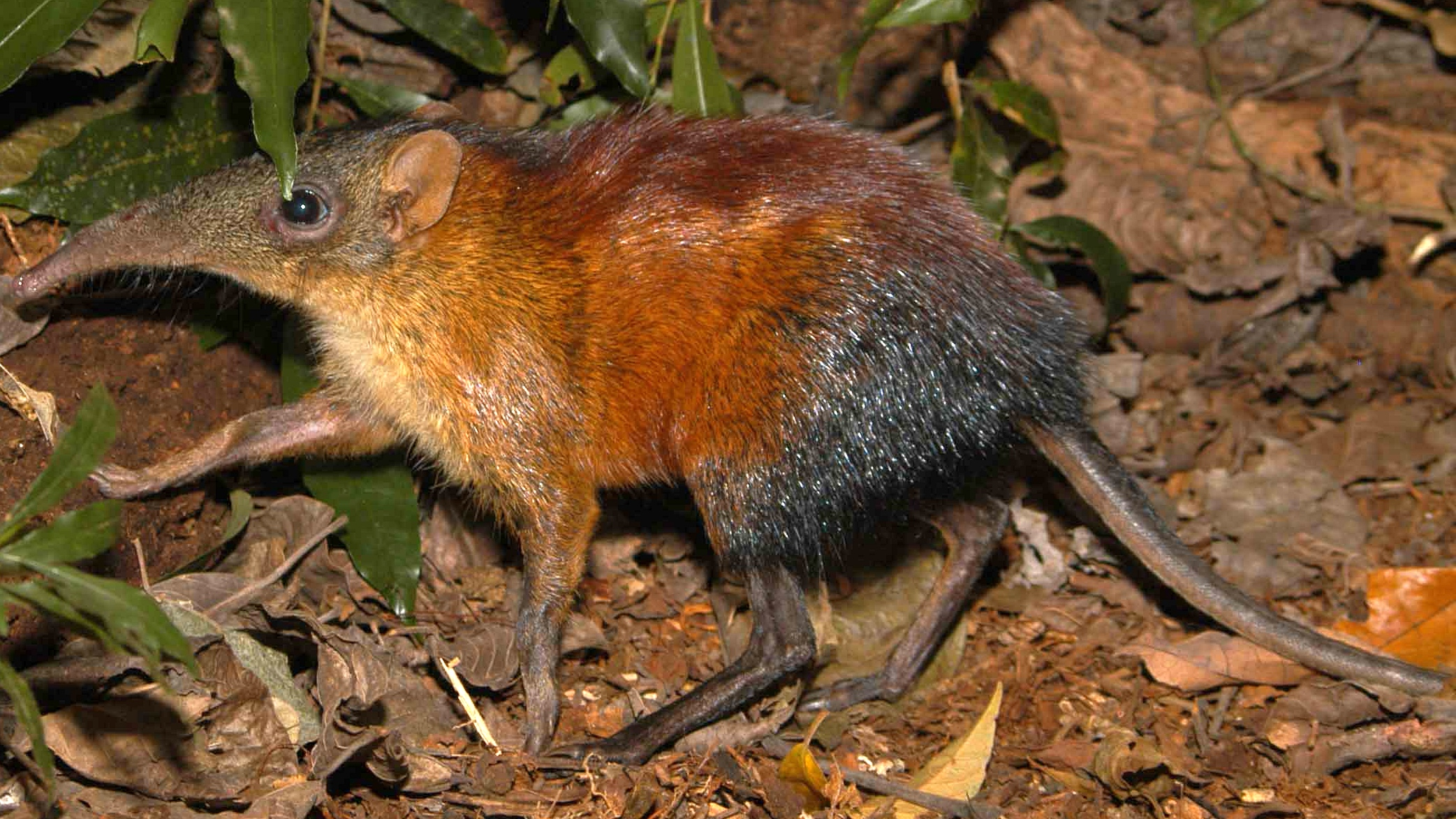
Rhynchocyon udzungwensis

== Taxonomy and evolution ==
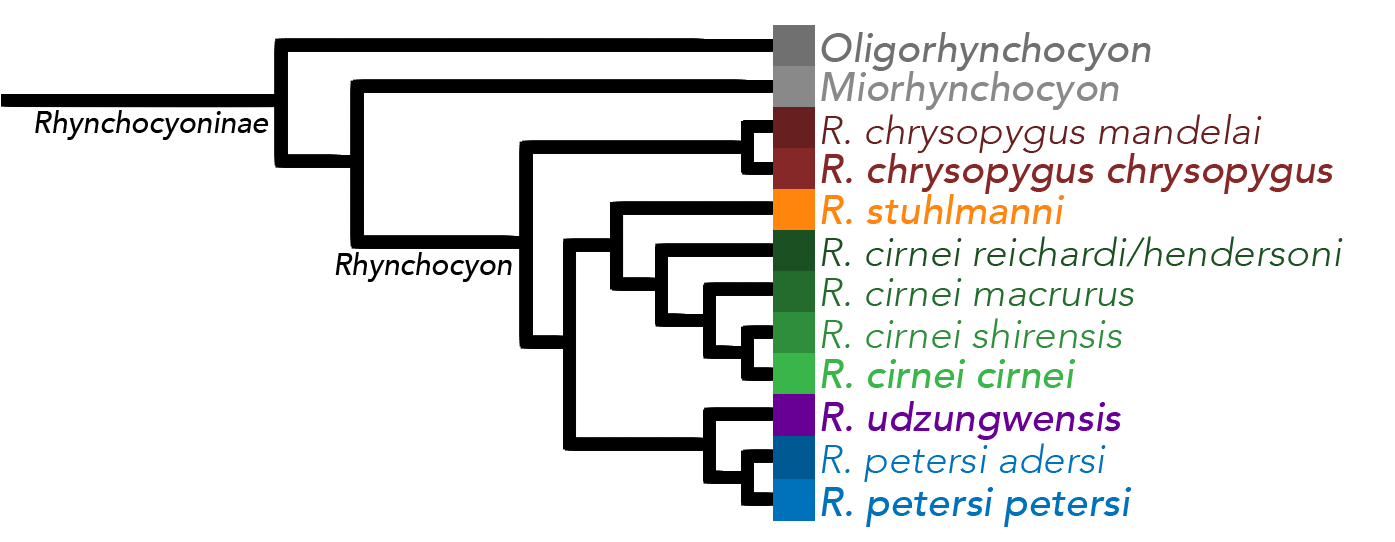
Phylogeny of Rhynchocyoninae subfamily with the extant members of the genus Rhynchocyon in color and extinct members in grey.

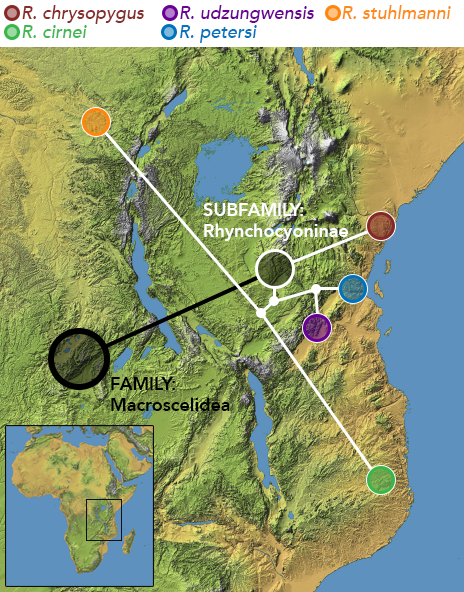
The Rhynchocyoninae subfamily ancestral biogeography illustrating a phylogeny mapped onto current distributions. The subfamily (in white) originated 7.9 Ma, while the family (in black) originated in central Africa prior, to at least 32.8 Ma.

The genus' taxonomic status has been difficult to determine due to the very close similarities between populations. Up to ten species have been recognized, but over time they have been regrouped into four species. Recently, R. cirnei, the species with the most subspecies, has had R. c. stuhlmanni separated into its own species based on updated molecular data.

Close genetic relatedness indicates that the common ancestor of the genus lived around 7.9 million years ago (Ma). There are, however, fossil taxa push this time further into the Oligocene. Miorhynchocyon meswae dates from the Meswa Bridge fossil site in Kenya dates to 22.5 Ma. Oligorhynchocyon songwensis from the Nsungwe Formation in Tanzania dates to 25 Ma. Other fossils of the subfamily Rhynchocyoninae are found between 18 and 23 Ma such as M. clarki and M. rusingae from about 20 Ma from Songhor fossil site in Kenya. This large gap between estimated divergence time of the genus indicates that M. meswae and O. songwensis species are likely stem taxa of the entire group. Because of Rhynchocyon's canopy forest and dense leaf litter requirements, the ancestors of the genus may have experienced selective pressures to become more greatly adapted to forest environments as the Miocene experienced a large expansion of grasslands. Several other extinct genera of the family Rhynchocyonidae have been described: Brevirhynchocyon and Hypsorhynchocyon. Eorhynchocyon (E. rupestris) is the oldest fossil species similar to giant sengis, but containing intermediate traits to those of Elephantulus and Petrodromus.

=== Unresolved taxonomic issues ===
Various classification issues still exist, with several undetermined questions left unresolved:

- Is the northern Kenyan population an entirely new species? (See below for resolution)
- Is R. c. hendersoni just an altitudinal variation of R. c. reichardi?
- Is R. c. shirensis just a minor variant of R. cirnei, unworthy of subspecies status?
- Should R. c. reichardi be a full species again?
- What is the genetic relationship between coat pattern in R. c. macrurus (southeastern Tanzania); R. stuhlmanni (Congo Basin); and R. c. cirnei and R. c. shirensis (Mozambique and southern Malawi)?

==== Northern Kenya subspecies ====
Mitochondrial DNA sequencing was conducted on a single specimen (dubbed the Boni giant sengi) from the Dodori and Boni national reserves in Kenya, as there was suspicion that there may be another species present based on specimen capture, sightings, and camera trap images.

The pelage pattern differs significantly from R. chrysopygus, as it does not have the bright yellow patch on its rump. It also does not possess the same pelage traits as R. petersi—the Boni giant sengi has dark brown and black skin on its ears and tail whereas R. petersi has orange skin. Its face is griseous yellow-brown and the black fur on its rump does not extend to the middle of the back like it does in R. petersi. The single captured specimen weighs about 600 grams, lighter than R. udzungwensis, but heavier than R. petersi. It also has no noticeable chequers, though the dark fur patterns obscures these in all dark-colored giant sengis. A unique feature not found among other giant sengis is the prominent crest of hair along the nape of the neck. Despite the pelage differences, initial DNA comparisons found it nearly identical to R. chrysopygus. A later DNA comparison supported a designation of a new subspecies, Rhynchocyon chrysopygus mandelai as it diverges in pelage and is allopatric to R. chrysopygus.

== Distribution ==
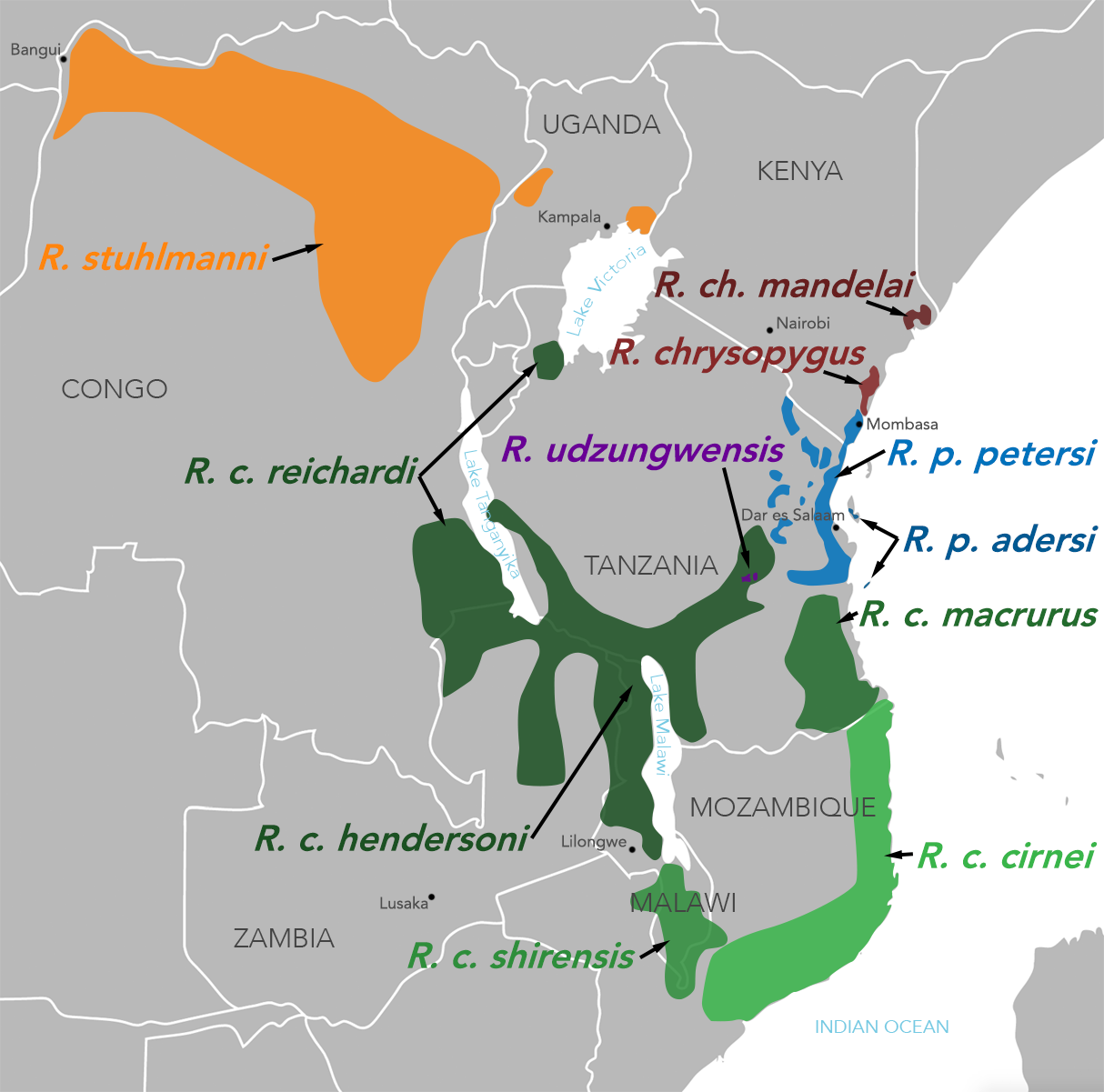
Geographic distribution of species and subspecies in the Rhynchocyon genus.

R. chrysopygus, R. cirnei, and R. petersi are allopatrically distributed; with the more recently discovered R. udzungwensis and subspecies R. cirnei reichardi exhibiting parapatric distributions. Some introgression (hybridization) has taken place between R. udzungwensis and R. cirnei reichardi as detected by mtDNA. R. p. adersi is rare and unique in its distribution, being found isolated on the islands of the Zanzibar Archipelago. R. c. reichardi is typically found in the Rift Valley highlands of Tanzania, Zambia, and Malawi, with R. c. hendersoni found in the highlands of northern Malawi.

Both R. c. hendersoni and R. c. shirensis are known at higher elevations, similar to that of R. udzungwensis; however R. udzungwensis is unique in its larger body size (being the largest giant sengi known). Bergmann's rule suggests that specialized ecological factors such as climate and temperature would favor larger bodies like that of R. udzungwensis, though the latter two species do not share this trait. For comparison, R. udzungwensis occurs in greater abundance at elevations above 1000 meters, has a body mass of 710 grams and a brain mass of 7131 milligrams, while R. petersi occurs at greater abundance at elevations between 0 and 2000 meters, has a body mass of 471 g, and a brain mass of 5400 mg.

Estimated of population size and density vary and can be difficult to determine. However, measurements of the species populations has been undertaken. R. chrysopygus, in protected areas, is about 150 individuals per square kilometer (about 14–20,000 individuals); R. petersi is between 19 and 80 individuals per square kilometer; R. udzungwensis has an estimated 15,000–24,000 individuals. R. udzungwensis has a tiny distribution (restricted to submontane and montane forest in the Ndundulu–Luho-mero and Mwanihana forests) compared to the other species but resides in land.

Table 1: Species and subspecies distribution data
Species	Localities	Elevation range (meters)
Rhynchocyon chrysopygus chrysopygus	Kenya (Arabuko-Sokoke Forest)	30–360 m
Rhynchocyon chrysopygus mandelai	Kenya (Boni National Reserve and Dodori National Reserve)	
Rhynchocyon cirnei cirnei	Mozambique (north of Zambezi River); Malawi, Zambia and Tanzania (highlands within Rift Valley); Tanzania (south of Rufiji River)	0–2100 m
Rhynchocyon cirnei reichardi	Tanzania, Malawi, and Zambia (highlands)	290–1800 m
Rhynchocyon cirnei hendersoni	Northern Malawi (highlands)	Similar to R. udzungwensis
Rhynchocyon cirnei shirensis	Southern Malawi (Shire Valley)	Similar to R. udzungwensis
Rhynchocyon petersi	Tanzania (Eastern Arc Mountains, West and East Usambara, Nguru, Nguu Uluguru mountains, North and South Pare mountains, and coastal fragmented forests from Rabai Hills and Diani Forest to Rufiji River.	0–2020 m
Rhynchocyon petersi adersi	Zanzibar Archipelago (only Unguja Island and Uzi Island) and Mafia Archipelago (only Mafia Island).	Undetermined, though they are restricted to Zanzibar's and Mafia Island's highest elevations of 119 and 53 meters respectively.
Rhynchocyon stuhlmanni	Democratic Republic of Congo (between the Congo and Ubangi Rivers); Uganda (western forests surrounding Lake Albert, Mabira Central Forest Reserve east of Kampala)	
Rhynchocyon udzungwensis	Udzungwa Mountains of Tanzania in the Kilombero District of the Morogoro Region and the Kilolo District of the Iringa Region (specifically, the Ndundulu-Luhomero and Mwanihana forests within the ).	350–2300 m

== Threats and Conservation ==
All species in the genus are threatened by habitat destruction (primarily deforestation). Forest fragmentation from human activities have created a patchwork of forest national parks and preserves. This has resulted in an uneven and variable level of legal protection.

=== Rhynchocyon chrysopygus ===
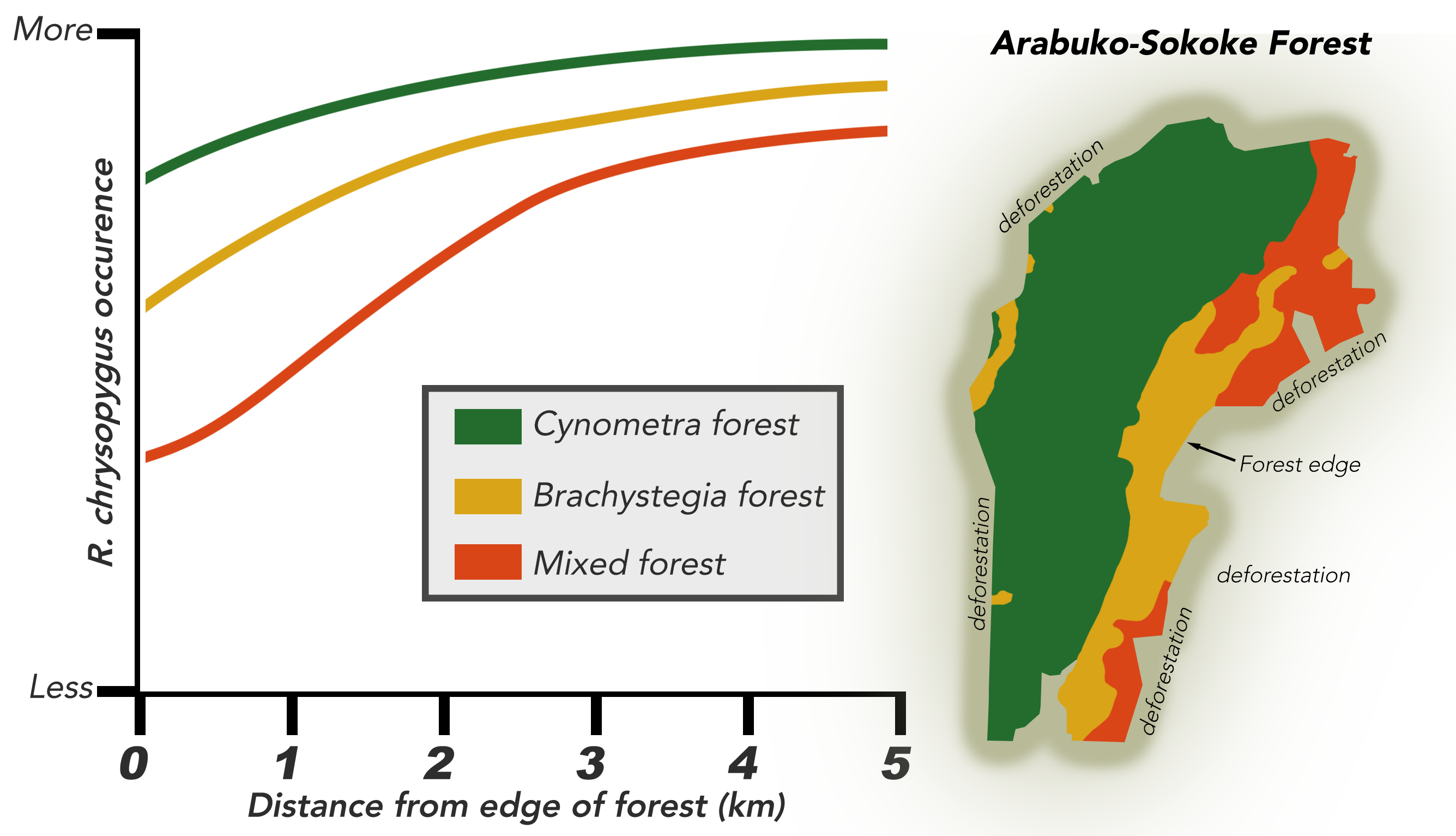
A map of the Arabuko-Sokoke Forest, Kenya with different habitat types: Cynometra forest/thicket (green), Brachystegia forest (yellow); mixed forest (burnt orange). The map also shows how the forest is a large fragment surrounded by deforested land. The graph shows Rhynchocyon chrysopygus occurrences in proximity with forest edges. The closer one gets to the edge of the forest, the less R. chrysopygus is present—indicating the habitat is less suitable.

Species particularly threatened are those with greatly restricted distributions such as R. udzungwensis and R. chrysopygus. Often, restricted ranges are habitats that are protected forests and preserves that are bordered by human settlements. R. chrysopygus for example, resides mostly in the Arabuko-Sokoke Forest as well as in patchy, fragmented forests between the Arabuko-Sokoke Forest and Mombasa. The Arabuko-Sokoke Forest provides only 395.4 km^{2} of suitable habitat, with an additional 30 km^{2} available in non-forest, isolated, scrub and degraded woodland fragments. Between 1993 and 1996, R. chrysopygus populations declined from 20,000 to 14,000. Tiny forest fragments put R. chrysopygus at greater risk of localized extinction due to agricultural clearing, harvesting of trees, and fires. One fragment population was assessed in 2008 and found only 20 individuals remained.

To illustrate the severe reduction of habitat over time, R. chrysopygus used to occupy uninterrupted coastal forests that spanned from Mombasa all the way to the Tana River. Eighty percent has been deforested, with only the Arabuko-Sokoke Forest remaining as the largest portion. R. chrysopygus uses about 328 km^{2}, with decreasing presence and activity the closer they are to the forest edges. Different types of habitats exist within this forest: Cynometra thickets, Brachystegia woodlands, and mixed forest (historically dominated by Afzelia quanzensis, a heavily logged tree species ). R. chrysopygus heavily favors Cynometra forests as well are mixed forest areas that have maintained plenty of A. quanzensis. The greatest issue facing R. chrysopygus from forest reduction is that removing trees eliminates tree-trunk hollows, thick leaf litter, and covered canopy—all critically important for survival and reproduction. These factors, alongside hunting and subsistence trapping, are why it is listed as Endangered by the IUCN. Human-driven pressures have not declined, with continued logging, hunting, and even a 2015 proposal to extract fossil fuels from parts of the forest.

With R. chrysopygus being listed by the IUCN Red List as Endangered, a strategic plan was developed for 2002–2027 for the Arabuko-Sokoke Forest, where the sengis were monitored for a three-year period. The forest is managed by two institutions: the Forest Department and the Kenya Wildlife Service as well as being listed as a National Monument as part of the Coast Forest Conservation Unit's efforts. This designation prevents human encroachment and development, but does not necessarily protect the biodiversity within.

=== Rhynchocyon cirnei (and R. stuhlmanni) ===
R. cirnei is listed as Least Concern with the IUCN, though this has limited specifics about the various subspecies. Range maps give an inaccurate visualization of the distribution, as the species is restricted to isolated montane forest patches, lowland forests, woodlands with closed tree canopies, and riparian thickets. In Mozambique, it is realistically only found in small, suitable forests areas. In the Central African Republic, only a single specimen of R. cirnei (which would technically now be R. stuhlmanni) has been found to the west of the Ubangi River, indicating an exaggerated distribution. Distributions within the Eastern Arc Mountains are patchy, and are threatened due to decreasing forested areas, fragmentation, and the reduction of habitat quality from human activity.

R. c. macrurus is at greater risk due to its more restricted range along the coastal areas of Tanzania due to increased human pressures. Mount Rungwe populations (technically R. c. reichardi are particularly at risk due to increase hunting in the region. One population of concern is the extremely small isolated range of R. cirnei (which would technically now be R. stuhlmanni) individuals in the Mabira Forest east of Kampala. This forest is only 300 km^{2} and has been the focus of political controversy due to plans to deforest a large portion of the reserve. The species lacks any specific conservation efforts, but is found within various protected areas throughout its range. Antelope and primate protection conservation efforts are likely to have unintentional benefits for R. cirnei.

=== Rhynchocyon petersi ===
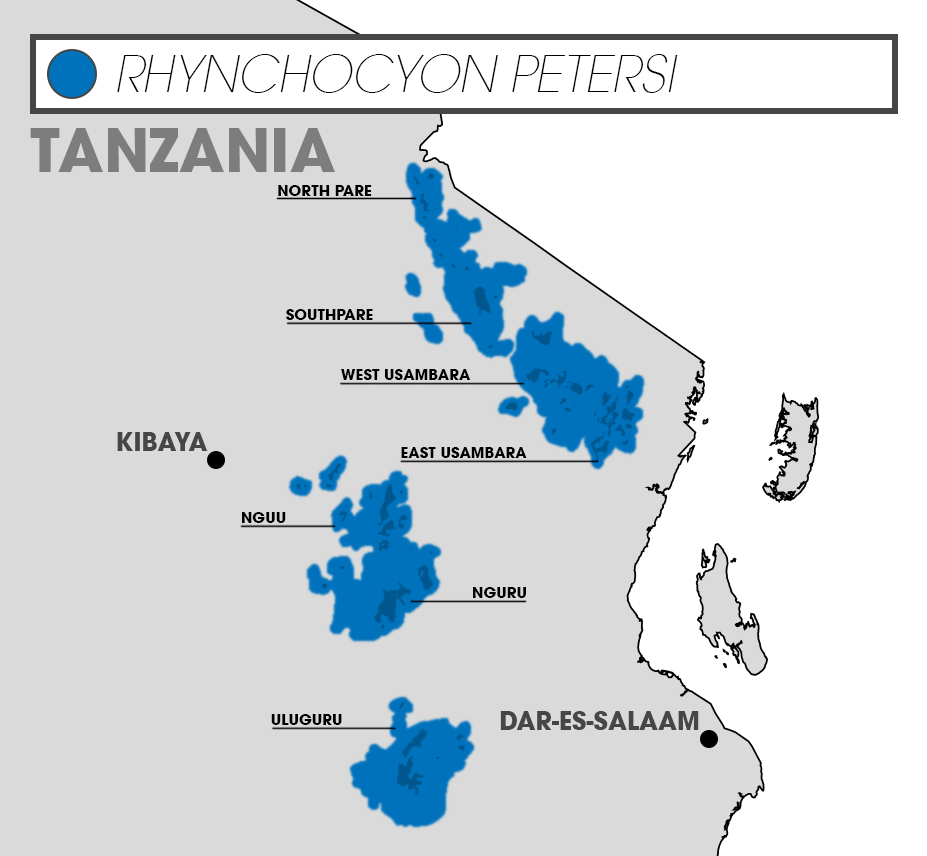
Distribution of Rhynchocyon petersi in the Tanzanian Eastern Arc Mountains. The species is typically limited to small, fragmented forest patches (darker blue) within the mountains (lighter blue).

R. petersi is listed as Least Concern with the IUCN; however, the species distribution is discontinuous due to human-caused habitat fragmentation that has created a mosaic of forest patches, parks, and reserves. Because of this complex distribution, many forest patches have not been surveyed so presence is unclear—especially the case for non-protected, coastal forest fragments. Notable and well-surveyed forests are those that are protected in forests (see Table 2). Between these protected forest patches exist unsuitable habitat; with coastal forest area fragments being particularly unsuitable due to extreme habitat degradation and severe isolation of remaining forest patches. A few coastal forest exceptions exist: the Selous Game Reserve and the Saadani National Park are well-managed protected lands in which R. petersi are commonly found, especially within the 20 km^{2} Zaraninge Forest within Saadani. Since forest fragmentation is the greatest threat to R. petersi, conservation focuses on the local drivers of this process: agricultural expansion and logging for firewood, charcoal production, and woodcarving. Hunting also plays a minor role in population declines, but is not thought to be a significant threat. R. petersi is unique in that it has been successfully bred in zoos allowing for the possibility of breeding and reintroduction programs.

Table 2: Eastern Arc Mountains Rhynchocyon petersi presence survey data
Mountain range	Surveyed protected land	Unsurveyed protected land
South Pare mountains	Chome Forest Reserve	Chambogo, Kwizu
North Pare mountains	Kamwalla II, Kindoroko, Minja, Mramba	Kiverenge
West Usambara mountains	Magamba, Ambangulu	Shaguya, Mkussu, Baga II, Ndelemai, Mafi Hill, Bangalai,
East Usambara mountains	Nilo, Bamba Ridge, Kambai, Kwamarimba, Kwamgumi, Manga, Mgambo, Mtai, Segoma,	Longuza South, Bombo West
Nguu mountains	Nguru North, Kilindi	Derema, Mkuli, Pumila, Rudewa
Nguru mountains	Nguru South, Kanga, Mkindo	
Uluguru mountains	Uluguru North, Uluguru South, Mkangazi	Ruvu
R. petersi is not found in Taita Hills, or the Mahenge, Malundwe, Ukaguru, Rubeho, and Udzungwa mountains and associated forest patches.

=== Rhynchocyon udzungwensis ===
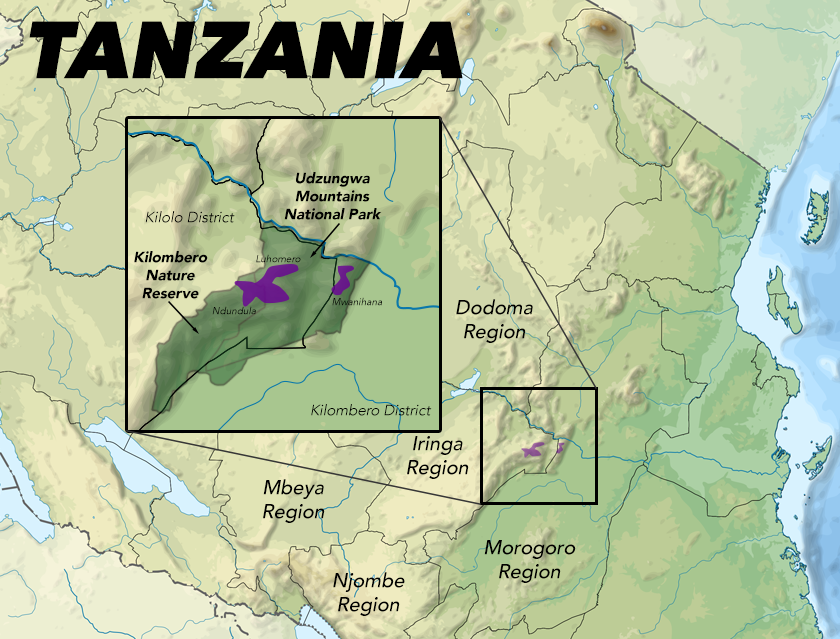
Rhynchocyon udzungwensis is found only in the Udzungwa Mountains of Tanzania in the Kilombero District of the Morogoro Region and the Kilolo District of the Iringa Region. The two forests (Ndundulu-Luhomero and Mwanihana) are located within the Udzungwa Mountains National Park and Kilombero Nature Reserve.

Listed as Vulnerable with the IUCN Red List, R. udzungwensis has a highly restricted and small geographic range of about 810 km^{2}. Because the distribution is in two locations (the Ndundulu-Luhomero forest and the Mwanihana forest), its suitable habitat makes up only 390 km^{2}, with a 25 km region between the two forests being less-suitable wooded grassland. Not all of the Udzungwa Mountains are protected, putting R. udzungwensis at greater risk from human pressures. The greatest threat facing the species is uncontrolled forest fires that cause loss of the required moist, montane canopy forests. Between 1970 and 2000, 2.71% of the Ndundulu-Luhomero forest was reduced, with another 0.51% lost from the Mwanihana forest. The land between the two forests has been significantly degraded as well, with human-caused fires as the greatest driver of habitat loss. Hehe people are known to hunt R. cirnei for food, but it is unknown if they hunt R. udzungwensis; though it is expected to become a future threat due to human population expansion in the surrounding areas. Since the two forests exist entirely within the Udzungwa Mountains National Park and Kilombero Nature Reserve, R. udzungwensis is protected from being used as food and for trade; though funding is low and ranger monitoring is limited. The park has an educational outreach program as part of its management plan budget.
