= Eorhynchocyon =

Eorhynchocyon Temporal range: Bartonian–Priabonian

Scientific classification
- Kingdom: Animalia
- Phylum: Chordata
- Class: Mammalia
- Infraclass: Placentalia
- Order: Macroscelidea
- Family: Rhynchocyonidae
- Genus: †Eorhynchocyon; Senut & Pickford, 2021
- Species: †E. rupestris

Binomial name
- †Eorhynchocyon rupestris Senut & Pickford, 2021

Extinct genus of mammals

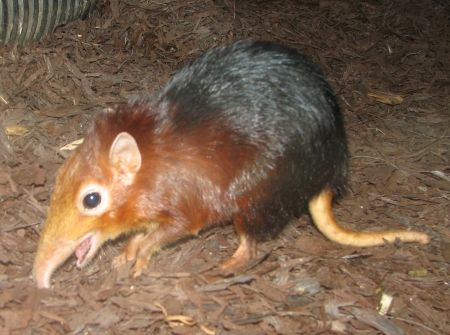
Eorhynchocyon resembled extant sengi (as presented Black and rufous sengi) in some traits

Eorhynchocyon is an extinct mammal genus from the macroscelidid superfamily.

Fossils of an unknown animal were found in Namibia. The fossils descended from Bartonian-Priabonian stage.

Authors describe it as a Macroscelidea member of middle size. As a diagnostic trait they enlisted convex mandible profile and ascending mandible ramus leaning backwordly. Mandible shape resembled the sengi, known scientifically as Hypsorhynchocyon. Whole mandible length measures 36 mm and alveolar processes are from 21.4 to 22 mm. In a half of mandible three incisors, one canine, four premolars and two molar was found. Identical dental formula characterises extant sengis. No diastema is present. Lower canine teeth have 2 roots converging partially or completely.

Senut and Pickford named the described genus Eorhynchocyon. First part of the generic name, prefix eo, has Greek origin and means dawn (Greek word eos was used in other taxa names, as Eocarcharia). Rhyncho denotes muzzle and cyon means dog. Altogether they consist a generic name of modern day mammal Rhynchocyon of common name sengi or elephant shrew. In the genus Eorhynchocyon a singular species was classified, namely Eorhynchocyon rupestris. Holotype is specimen EC7 7.2a, comprising complete left mandible. Type locality is Eocliff 7, Namibia.
