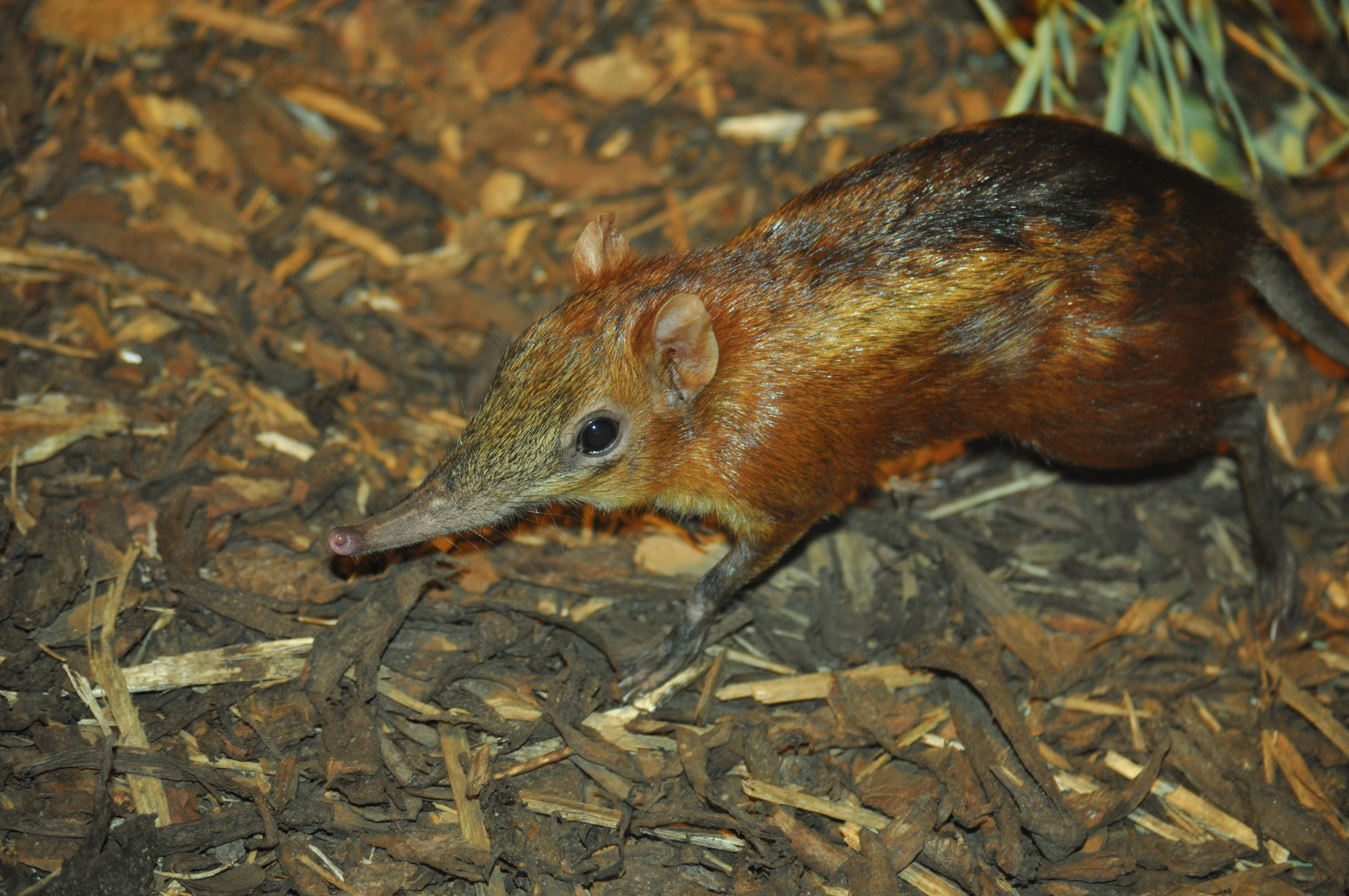
- Prague Zoo, Czech Republic

Conservation status
- Least Concern (IUCN 3.1)

Scientific classification
- Kingdom: Animalia
- Phylum: Chordata
- Class: Mammalia
- Infraclass: Placentalia
- Order: Macroscelidea
- Family: Macroscelididae
- Genus: Rhynchocyon
- Species: R. cirnei

Binomial name
- Rhynchocyon cirnei Peters, 1847
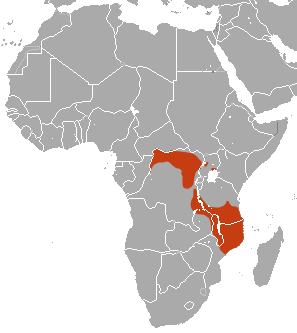
- Checkered sengi range

= Chequered sengi =

Checkered sengi

Species of mammal

The chequered sengi or checkered sengi (Rhynchocyon cirnei), also known as the chequered elephant shrew or checkered elephant shrew, is a species of small mammal belonging to the sengi family (Macroscelididae).

== Taxonomy ==
Six subspecies of the chequered sengi were recognized in the third edition of Mammal Species of the World, published 2005:

- R. c. cirnei
- R. c. hendersoni
- R. c. macrurus
- R. c. reichardi
- R. c. shirensis
- R. c. stuhlmanni

The subspecies R. c. stuhlmanni may represent a separate species.

== Description ==
Chequered sengis will grow to be around 25–30 cm (9.8–11.8 in) long, excluding their tail, making them one of the longest sengis. Their average tail length is slightly over 25 centimeters, which is slightly shorter than their body length. They commonly weigh around half a kilogram (1.1 pounds), but will sometimes grow to be about 0.7 kg (1.5 lb). Their coat is usually a light to medium brown, but it can range from beige to dark brown. Their back contains alternating chestnut and lighter colors, creating a chequered pattern. Chequered sengis also contain stripes on the sides of their body, which have a darker color than most of their body.

== Range and habitat ==
It is found in Democratic Republic of the Congo, Malawi, Mozambique, Tanzania, Uganda, Zambia, and possibly Central African Republic. Its natural habitats are subtropical or tropical dry forest, subtropical or tropical moist lowland forest, subtropical or tropical moist montane forest, and subtropical or tropical dry shrubland. It is threatened by habitat loss.

== Behavior and ecology ==
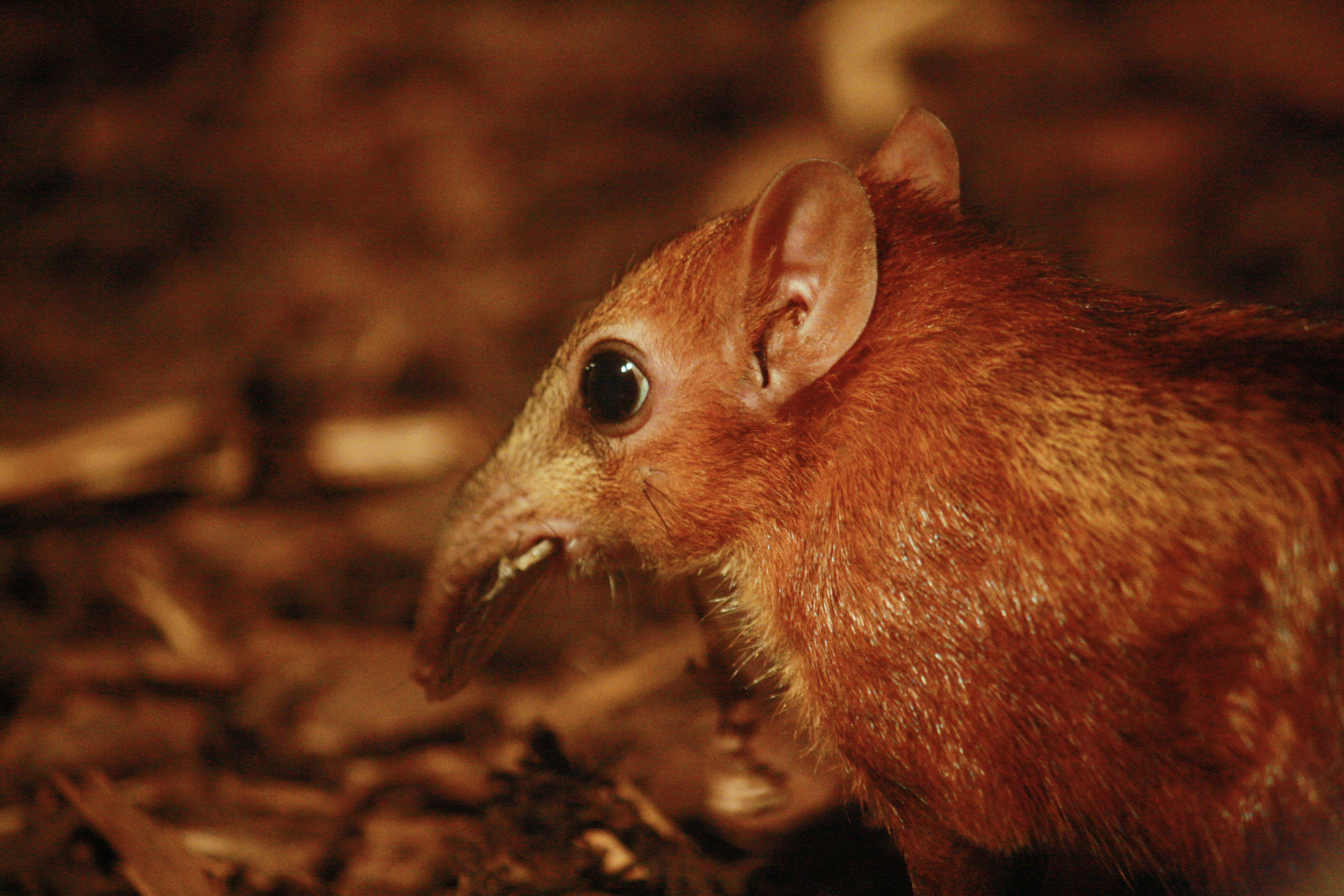
A captive chequered sengi eating an insect

Chequered sengis are exclusively diurnal and likely monogamous. Chequered sengis that are in a male-female pair build a nest out of leaf litter but spend much of their time apart. They breed year-round and produce up to three young per litter.

=== Diet ===
The chequered sengi is primarily an insectivore, eating termites, ants, beetles and centipedes. It also will eat mollusks, eggs and small mammals, amphibians and birds.
