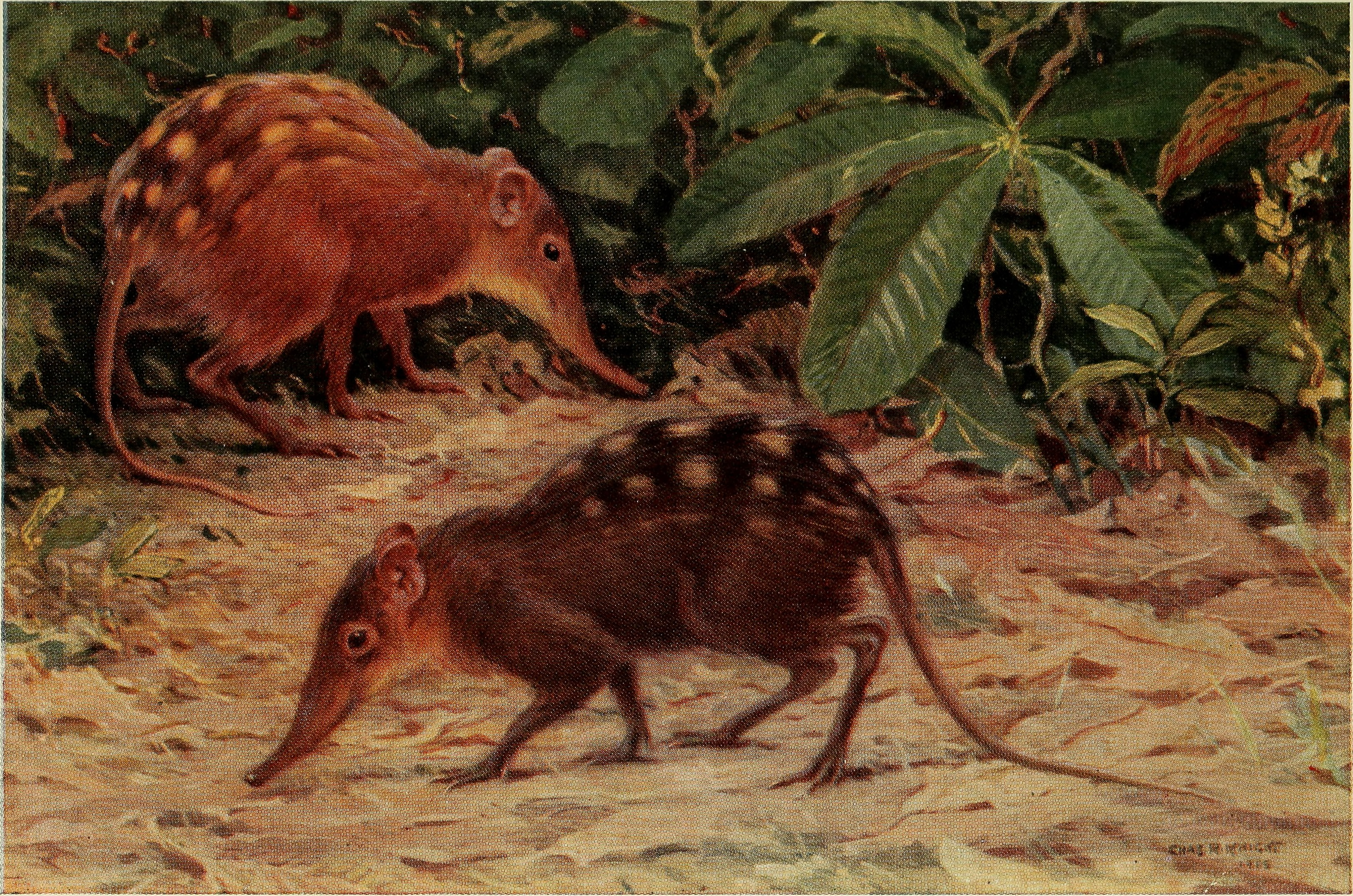
- Stuhlmann's sengi

Scientific classification
- Kingdom: Animalia
- Phylum: Chordata
- Class: Mammalia
- Infraclass: Placentalia
- Order: Macroscelidea
- Family: Macroscelididae
- Genus: Rhynchocyon
- Species: R. stuhlmanni

Binomial name
- Rhynchocyon stuhlmanni (Matschie, 1893)
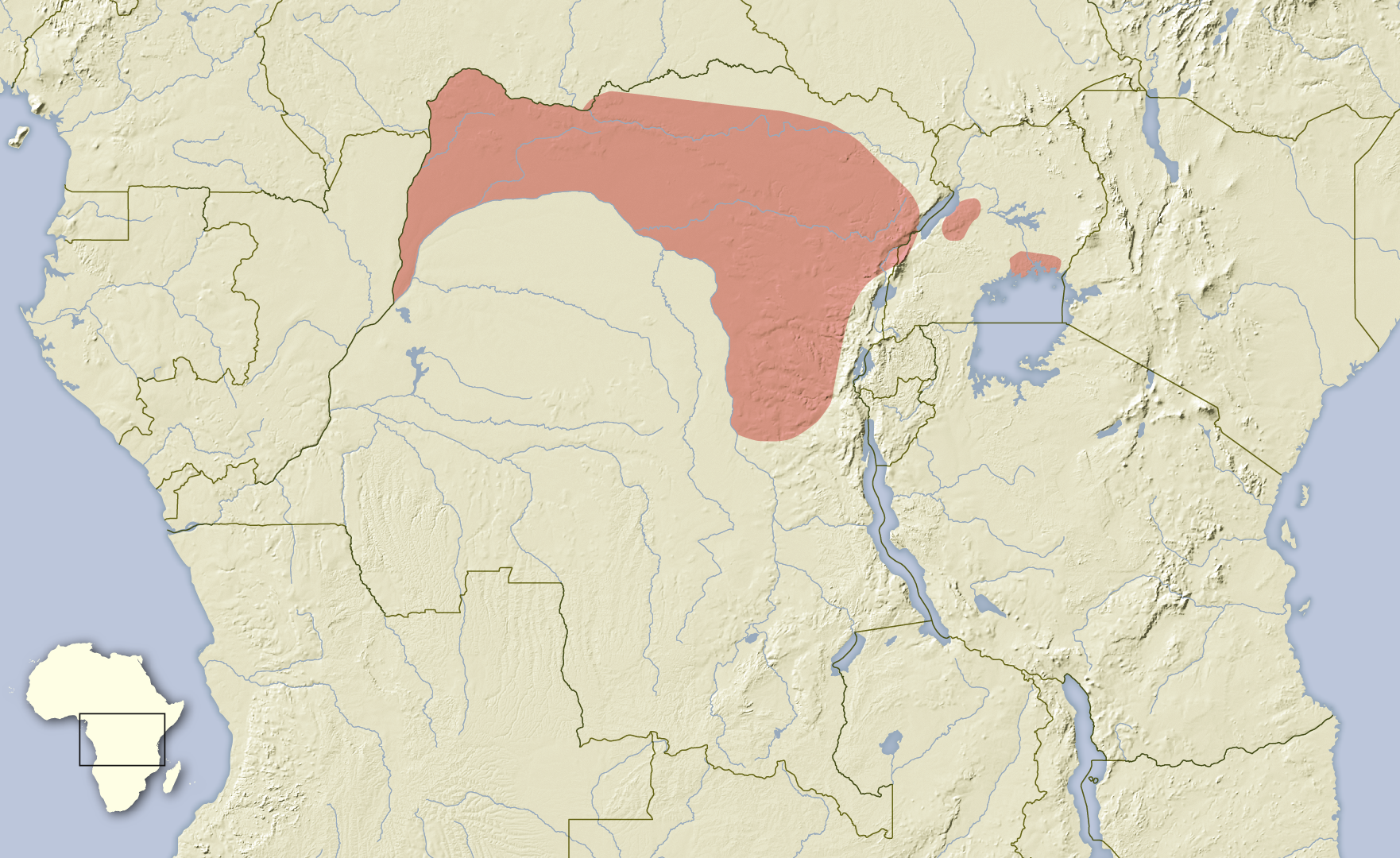
- Map of the distribution of Rhynchocyon stuhlmanni

= Stuhlmann's sengi =

Species of sengi living in Africa

The Stuhlmann's sengi or white-tailed sengi (Rhynchocyon stuhlmanni) is a species of sengi that lives in the forests and savannas of Africa. It was discovered in 1893 and declared a new species. In the 1960s, however, it was downgraded to a subspecies of checkered sengi (Rhynchocyon cirnei). In 2018, following genetic tests, scientists re-evaluated the mammal as a full species again.

The sengi is named after Franz Stuhlmann, a German zoologist, whose name is also found on a variety of other Central African species and subspecies, including Stuhlmann's golden mole (Chrysochloris stuhlmanni), Stuhlmann's double-collared sunbird (Cinnyris stuhlmanni), Stuhlmann's starling (Poeoptera stuhlmanni), Stuhlmann's weaver (Ploceus baglafecht stuhlmanni), and Stuhlmann's blue monkey (Cercopithecus mitis stuhlmanni).
