= Miorhynchocyon =

Miorhynchocyon Temporal range: Miocene

Scientific classification
- Kingdom: Animalia
- Phylum: Chordata
- Class: Mammalia
- Infraclass: Placentalia
- Order: Macroscelidea
- Genus: †Miorhynchocyon; Butler, 1984

Species
- Miorhynchocyon clarki Butler and Hopwood, 1957; Miorhynchocyon meswae Butler, 1984; Miorhynchocyon gariepensis Senut, 2003

Extinct genus of sengi

Miorhynchocyon is an extinct genus of sengi that lived in East Africa during the Miocene epoch.

== Etymology ==
The generic name Miorhynchocyon derives from the name of the extant macroscelidean genus Rhynchocyon. The prefix mio- references the Miocene epoch, during which the animal lived.

== Distribution ==
Miorhynchocyon fossils are known from both Rusinga Island and the site of Ngira, preserving a far more open and drier palaeoenvironment, in Kenya. Fossils are also known from Uganda.
