= North Pare Mountains =

Mountain range in Kilimanjaro Region of Tanzania

- Milima ya Upare Kaskazini (Swahili)
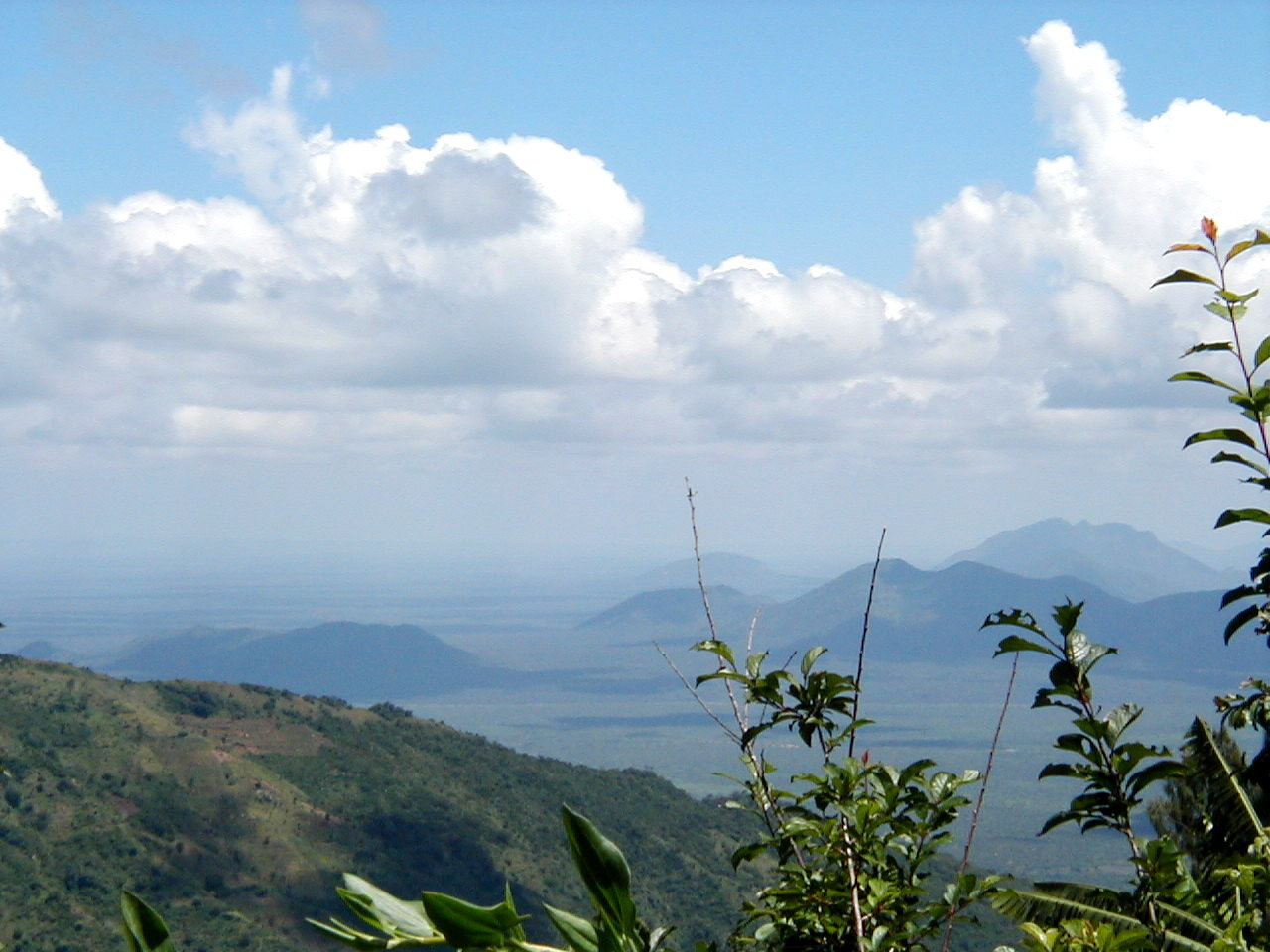
- North Pare Mountains

Highest point
- Peak: Kindoroko
- Elevation: 2,100 m (6,900 ft)
- Coordinates: 3°43′59.88″S 37°39′0″E

Geography
- Country: Tanzania
- Region: Kilimanjaro Region
- District: Mwanga District

The North Pare Mountains is a mountain range located entirely within Mwanga District of Kilimanjaro Region of northern Tanzania, extending from Ruvu River on the border with Moshi Rural District to Mgagao Ward in on the border with Same District. The range is part of East Africa's Eastern Arc Mountains chain known as the Pare Mountains. The other range is the South Pare Mountains. The North Pare and South Pare mountains are named after the original inhabitants of the area, the Pare people. The average elevation of the highlands is 1613m. The highest peak in the North Pare is Kindoroko Peak at 2,100m. The North Pare Mountains are divided into four ranges, Mramba in the northeast, Ngofe in the north, Mruma in the center, and Mwanga Ndorowe to the south. The mountains are also home to archaeological sites of ancient iron smithing done by the ancestors of the Pare. Currently, there are three protected forests on the mountain range; Kindoroko, Minja, and Mramba forest reserves.
