= South Pare Mountains =

Mountain range in Kilimanjaro Region of Tanzania

- Milima ya Upare Kusini (Swahili)

Highest point
- Peak: Shengena Peak
- Elevation: 2,463 m (8,081 ft)
- Coordinates: 4°16′4.08″S 37°55′53.4″E

Geography
- Country: Tanzania
- Region: Kilimanjaro Region
- District: Same District

The South Pare Mountains is a mountain range located entirely within Same District of Kilimanjaro Region of northern Tanzania, extending from Vumari ward on the border with Mwanga District to Kalemawe ward in on the border with Lushoto District in Tanga Region. The range is part of the Eastern Arc Mountains chain in East Africa. With the North Pare Mountains they make up the Pare Mountains chain. The North and South Pare mountains are named after the original inhabitants of the area, the Pare people. The highest peak in South Pare is Shengena Peak at 2,463m.

The average elevation of the highlands is 907m. One Nature Reserve (Chome) and eight gazetted Forest Reserves (Chambogo, Kiranga-Hengae, Chongweni, Kankoma, Kisiwani, Vumari, Kwizu, Maganda), two proposed Forest Reserves (Kwamwenda, Mwala), and three proposed Village Forest Reserves (Dido, Mambugi, Ishereto) make up the South Pare mountains. They cover a total of 27,168 hectares. The forest habitat in Chome varies from sub-montane to montane and upper montane, with some montane heath. In the sub-montane forest, Parinari excelsa grows abundantly, while in the montane forest, Ocotea usambarensis, Albizia gummifera, and Podocarpus latifolius thrive.
