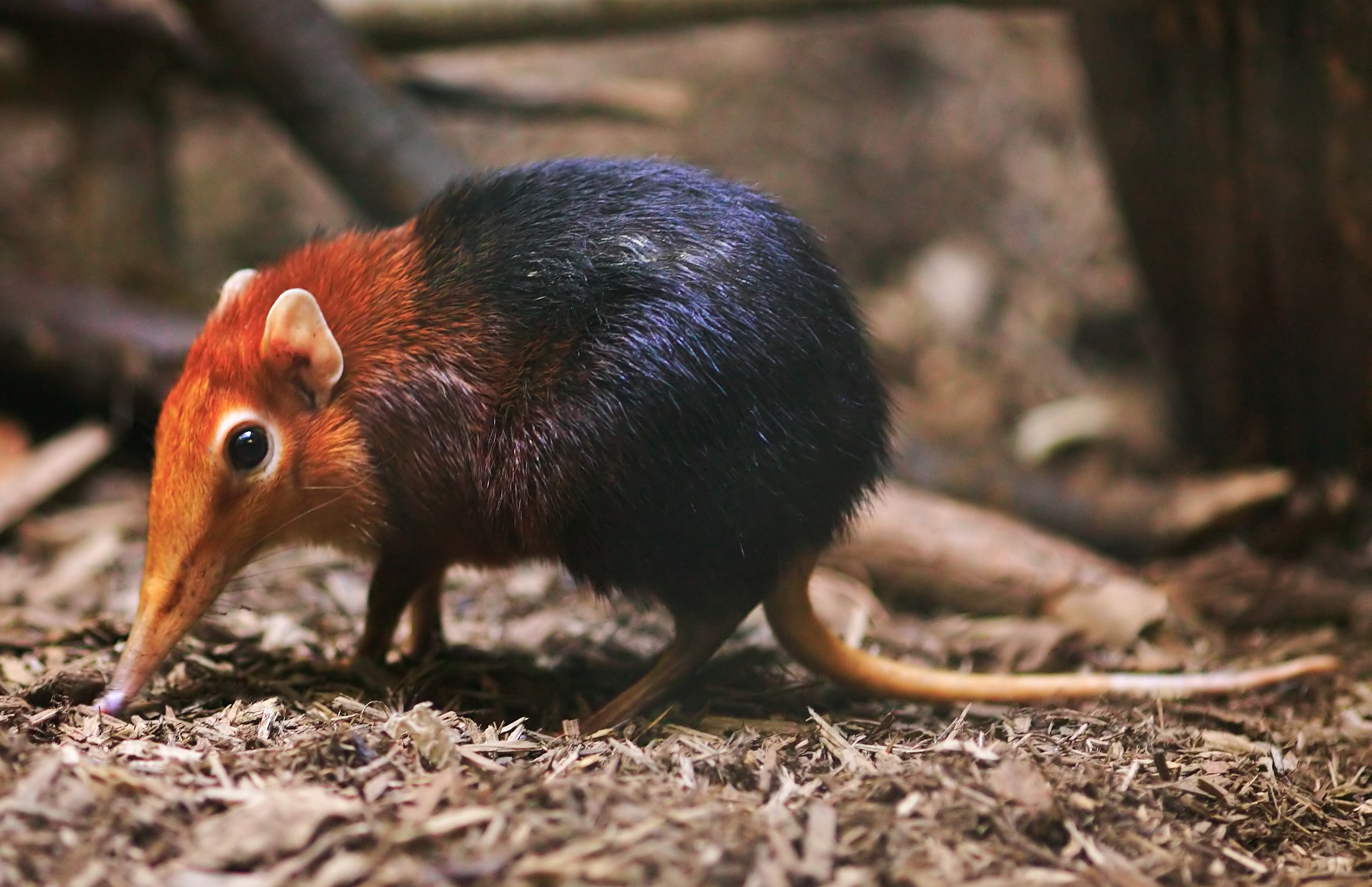

Conservation status
- Least Concern (IUCN 3.1)

Scientific classification
- Kingdom: Animalia
- Phylum: Chordata
- Class: Mammalia
- Infraclass: Placentalia
- Order: Macroscelidea
- Family: Macroscelididae
- Genus: Rhynchocyon
- Species: R. petersi

Binomial name
- Rhynchocyon petersi Bocage, 1880
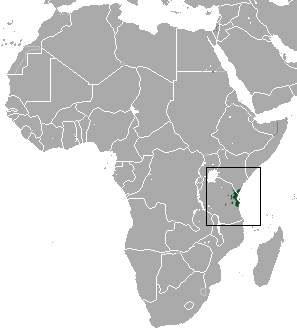
- Geographic range

= Black and rufous sengi =

Species of mammal

The black and rufous sengi or black and rufous elephant shrew (Rhynchocyon petersi), also known as the Zanj sengi or Zanj elephant shrew, is one of the 17 species of sengi found only in Africa. It is native to the lowland montane and dense forests of Kenya and Tanzania. Like other members of the genus Rhynchocyon, it is a relatively large species, with adults averaging about 28 cm (11 in) in length and 450–700 g (16–25 oz) in weight.

== Distribution and habitat ==
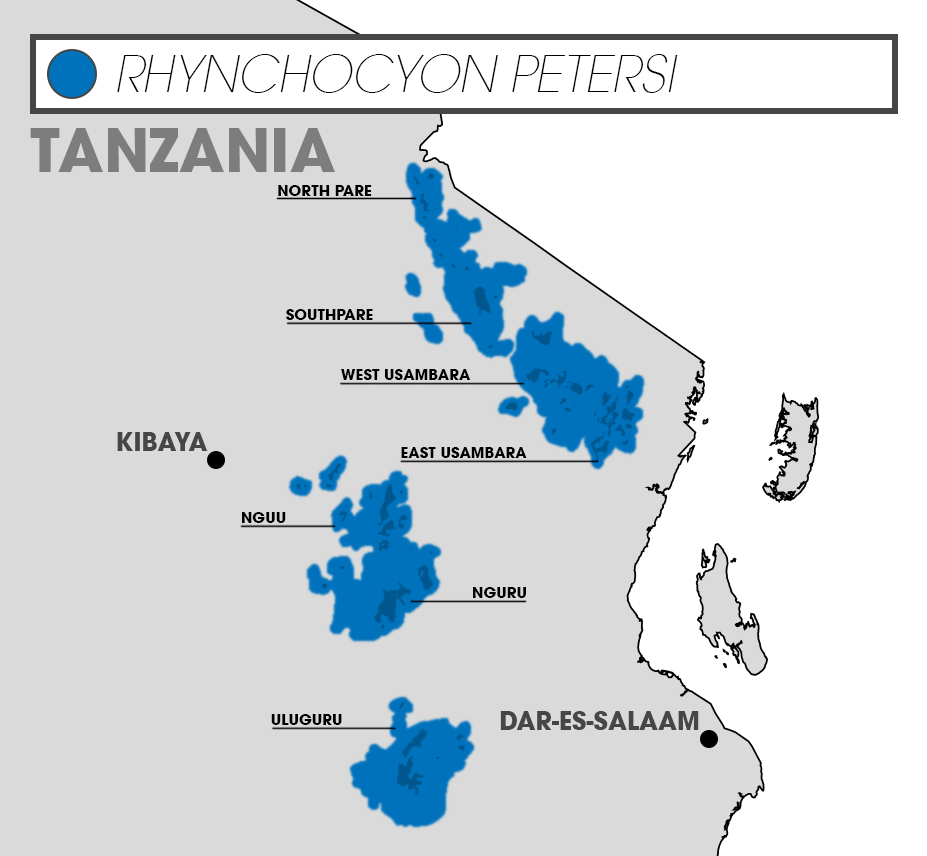
Distribution of Rhynchocyon petersi in the Tanzanian Eastern Arc Mountains. The species is typically limited to small, fragmented forest patches (darker blue) within the mountains (blue).

The forests of the Eastern Arc Mountains are critical habitats for R. petersi. The Chome Forest Reserve in Tanzania is an isolated, and largely undisturbed, habitat for the shrews. Population densities in the Chome area are significantly lower than the surrounding areas, home to approximately 2700 R. petersi, thought to be the result of restricted migration and illegal human activity. It was once listed by the IUCN Red List as vulnerable, but has since been changed to a status of least concern. However, its numbers are reportedly declining; suffering from severe forest fragmentation and degradation from human expansion.

== Diet and behaviour ==
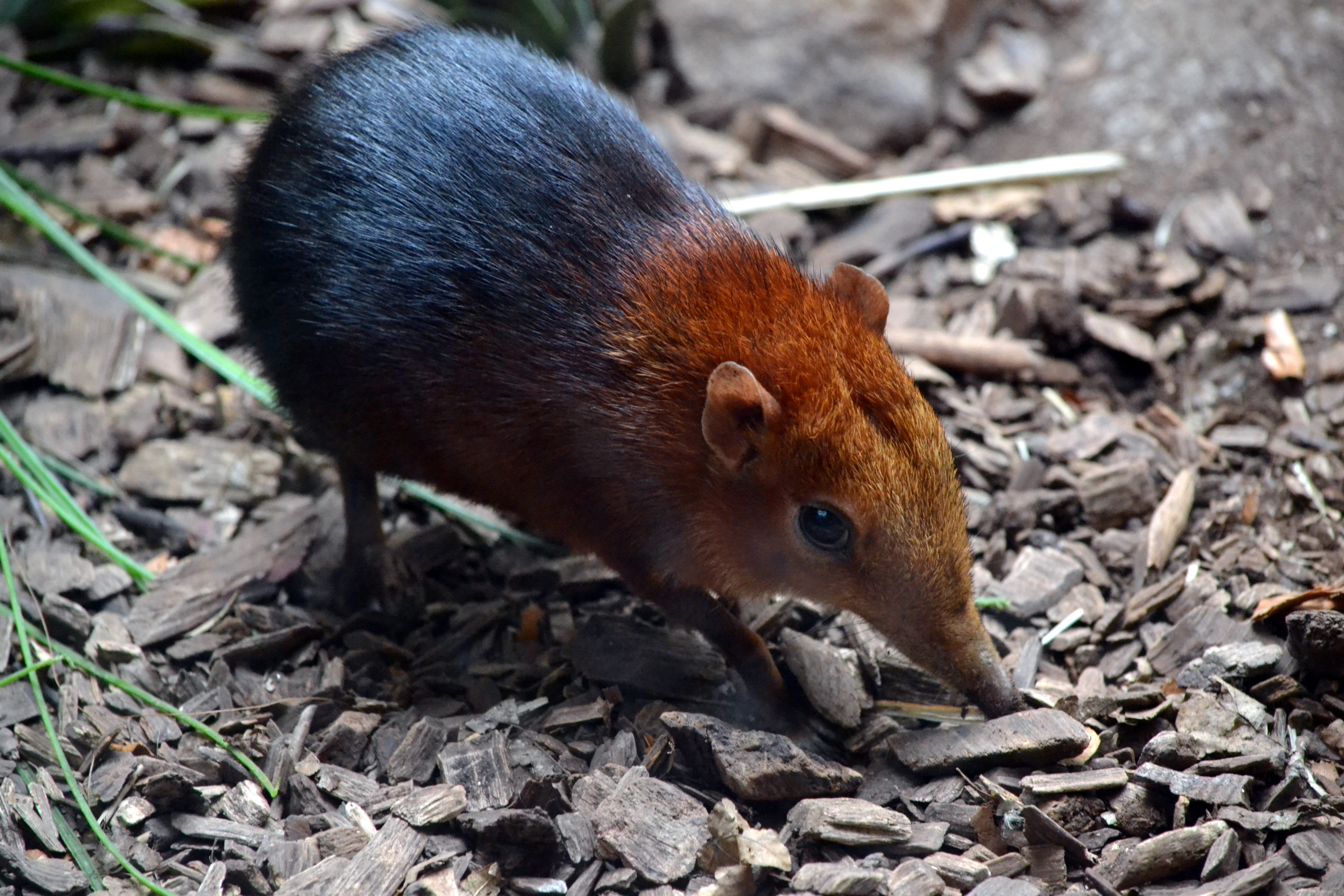
Young, captive black and rufous sengi foraging

It eats insects such as beetles, termites, and centipedes, using its proboscis to dig them from the soil and its tongue to lick them up. Like most sengis, it lives in monogamous pairs, defending hectare-sized territories. It typically builds ground level nests for shelter requiring dry leaf litter often at the base of trees.

== Sengis in zoological gardens ==
Several zoos have begun breeding this sengi, including seven in Europe, such as the Prague and Wrocław zoos, along with four zoos in the United States including the Philadelphia Zoo. For example, two black and rufous sengi males were born on February 4, 2007, at the National Zoo in Washington, D.C..
