= List of mammals =

Animals in class Mammalia

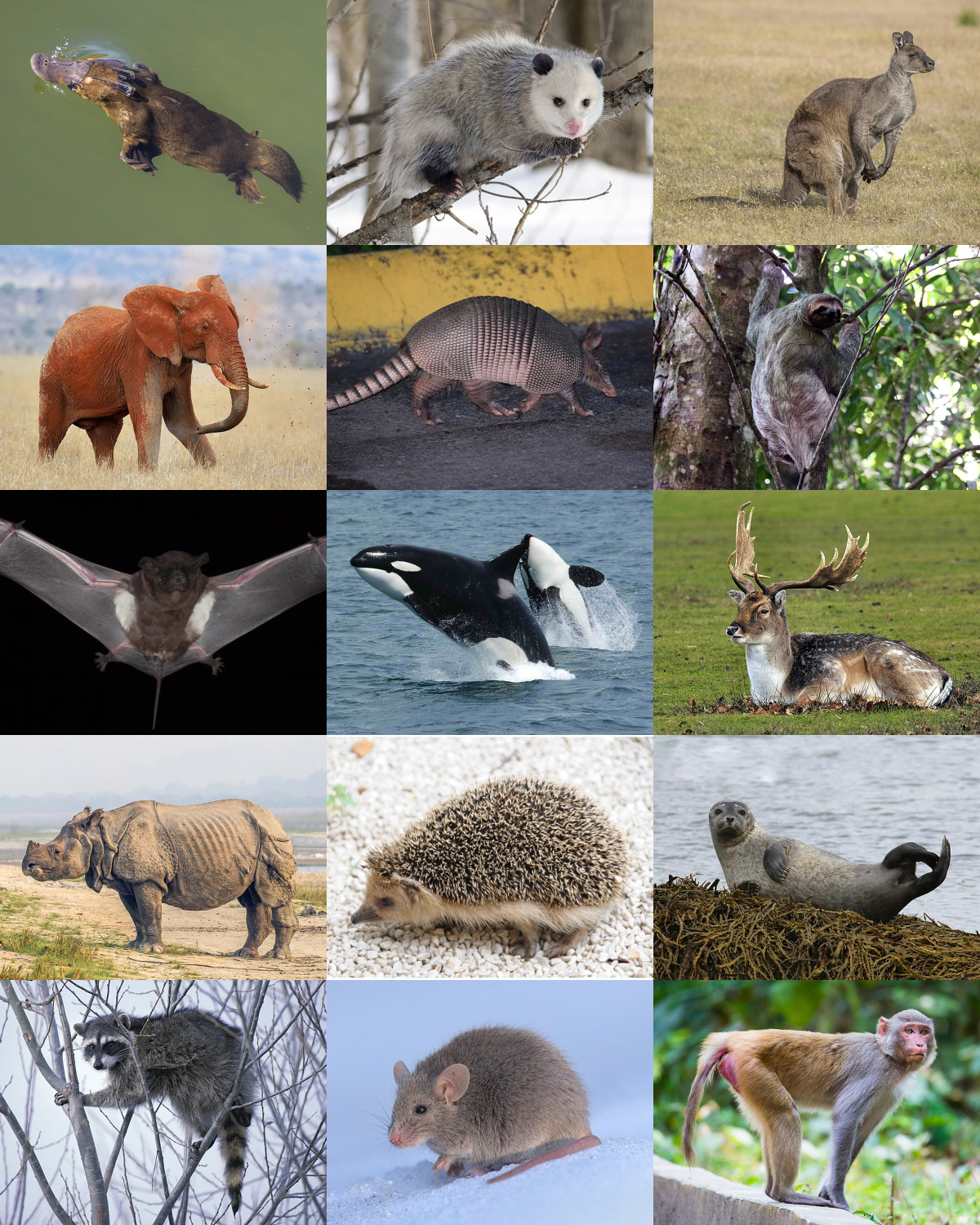
Mammals from different orders. From top left to bottom right: Monotremata (platypus), Didelphimorphia (opossum), Diprotodontia (kangaroo), Proboscidea (elephant), Cingulata (armadillo), Pilosa (sloth), Chiroptera (bat), Artiodactyla (whale), Artiodactyla (deer), Perissodactyla (rhinoceros), Eulipotyphla (hedgehog), Carnivora (seal), Carnivora (raccoon), Rodentia (mouse), Primate (monkey)

Mammalia is a class of vertebrate animals. Members of this class are called mammals. It comprises 6,122 extant species, which are grouped into 1,308 genera in 163 families, themselves grouped into 27 orders in 3 major divisions. These orders contain between one and thousands of species. Mammals are characterized by the presence of mammary glands which in females produce milk for feeding their young, a neocortex region of the brain, and fur or hair. Mammals are native to all major land masses and the oceans, and can be found worldwide. They live in every habitat on Earth. The basic mammalian body type is quadrupedal, with most mammals using four limbs for terrestrial locomotion, but in some the limbs are adapted for life at sea, in the air, in trees or underground. They range in length from Kitti's hog-nosed bat, at 2 cm (1 in) with no tail, to the blue whale, at 32.6 m (107 ft) long, including tail.

The three major divisions of mammals are the infraclass Marsupialia, containing the marsupial animals wherein the young are carried in a pouch; the infraclass Placentalia, for which the fetus is carried in the uterus, and the order Monotremata, containing egg-laying species. Marsupialia contains 333 species, Monotremata contains 5, and Placentalia contains the vast majority of extant mammals at 5,783 species. The majority of mammals, in terms of number of species, are in the two largest orders: Rodentia, or rodents, with 2,362 species, and Chiroptera, or bats, with 1,513. The exact organization of the species is not fixed, with many recent proposals made based on molecular phylogenetic analysis. In addition to the extant mammals, 72 species have been driven extinct since 1500 CE.

== Conventions ==
The hierarchy of biological classification's eight major taxonomic ranks. Intermediate minor rankings are not shown.

The author citation for the family is given before the included genera; parentheses around the author citation indicate that this was not the original taxonomic placement. Range maps are provided wherever possible; if a range map is not available, a description of the collective range of species in that family is provided. Ranges are based on the International Union for Conservation of Nature (IUCN) Red List of Threatened Species unless otherwise noted. All extinct families, genera, or species listed alongside extant species went extinct after 1500 CE, and are indicated by a dagger symbol "†".

== Classification ==
The class Mammalia consists of 6,122 extant species grouped into 1,308 genera belonging to 163 families. This does not include hybrid species or extinct prehistoric species. Modern molecular studies indicate that the 163 families can be grouped into 27 orders; these orders are divided into 3 major groupings: Marsupialia, an infraclass containing 7 orders of mammals which give birth to relatively undeveloped young that often reside in a pouch located on their mothers' abdomen for a time; Placentalia, an infraclass containing 19 orders of mammals that have fetuses that are carried in the uterus, and Monotremata, an order of egg-laying mammals. Within these groupings, the orders are organized into named clades, and some of these orders are subdivided into named suborders. An additional 72 species have been driven extinct since 1500 CE: 15 in Marsupialia and 57 in Placentalia.

Infraclass Marsupialia

- Ameridelphia
  - Order Didelphimorphia (opossums): 1 family, 93 species (1 extinct)
  - Order Paucituberculata (shrew opossums) : 1 family, 7 species
- Superorder Australidelphia
  - Order Dasyuromorphia (Australian carnivorous marsupials): 2 families, 73 species (2 extinct)
  - Order Diprotodontia (kangaroos and possums)
    - Suborder Macropodiformes (kangaroos and potoroos): 3 families, 80 species (9 extinct)
    - Suborder Phalangeriformes (possums): 6 families, 64 species
    - Suborder Vombatiformes (koala and wombats): 2 families, 4 species
  - Order Microbiotheria (monito del monte): 1 family, 2 species
  - Order Notoryctemorphia (marsupial mole): 1 family, 2 species
  - Order Peramelemorphia (bandicoots and bilbies): 3 families, 20 species (1 extinct)

Infraclass Placentalia

- Superorder Afrotheria
  - Order Afrosoricida (golden moles and tenrecs)
    - Suborder Chrysochloridea (golden moles): 1 family, 21 species
    - Suborder Tenrecomorpha (otter shrews and tenrecs): 2 families, 34 species
  - Order Hyracoidea (hyraxes): 1 family, 5 species
  - Order Macroscelidea (elephant shrews): 1 family, 19 species
  - Order Proboscidea (elephants): 1 family, 3 species
  - Order Sirenia (sea cows): 2 families, 5 species (1 extinct)
  - Order Tubulidentata (aardvark): 1 family, 1 species
- Superorder Euarchontoglires
  - Order Scandentia (treeshrews): 2 families, 23 species
  - Order Dermoptera (colugos): 1 family, 2 species
  - Order Lagomorpha (hares and pikas): 2 families, 93 species
  - Order Primates (primates)
    - Suborder Haplorhini (simians and tarsiers): 9 families, 389 species
    - Suborder Strepsirrhini (lemurs, lorises and galagos): 7 families, 142 species
  - Order Rodentia (rodents)
    - Suborder Anomaluromorpha (scaly-tailed squirrels and springhares): 2 families, 9 species
    - Suborder Castorimorpha (gophers and kangaroo rats): 3 families, 101 species
    - Suborder Hystricomorpha (porcupines, mole-rats and Neotropical spiny rats): 18 families, 303 species (15 extinct)
    - Suborder Myomorpha (mice and rats): 9 families, 1,673 species (24 extinct)
    - Suborder Sciuromorpha (dormice and squirrels): 3 families, 314 species
- Superorder Laurasiatheria
  - Order Artiodactyla (even-toed ungulates)
    - Suborder Ruminantia (ruminants): 6 families, 227 species
    - Suborder Suina (pigs and peccaries): 2 families, 20 species
    - Suborder Tylopoda (camels): 1 family, 7 species
    - Suborder Whippomorpha (whales and hippopotamuses): 15 families, 99 species
  - Order Carnivora (wolves and cats)
    - Suborder Caniformia (wolves, weasels, and seals): 9 families, 173 species (2 extinct)
    - Suborder Feliformia (cats and mongooses): 6 families, 125 species
  - Order Chiroptera (bats)
    - Suborder Yangochiroptera (leaf-nosed and vesper bats): 14 families, 1084 species (3 extinct)
    - Suborder Yinpterochiroptera (fruit and horseshoe bats): 6 families, 437 species (6 extinct)
  - Order Eulipotyphla (hedgehogs and shrews): 4 families, 497 species (1 extinct)
  - Order Perissodactyla (odd-toed ungulates)
    - Suborder Ceratomorpha (rhinoceroses and tapirs): 2 families, 9 species
    - Suborder Hippomorpha (horses): 1 family, 9 species
  - Order Pholidota (pangolins): 1 family, 8 species
- Superorder Xenarthra
  - Order Cingulata (armadillos): 2 families, 22 species
  - Order Pilosa (sloths and anteaters)
    - Suborder Folivora (sloths): 2 families, 6 species
    - Suborder Vermilingua (anteaters): 2 families, 10 species

Order Monotremata (platypus and echidnas): 2 families, 5 species

=== Phylogeny ===
The phylogenetic relations between the families in Mammalia are as displayed in this cladogram:

- Mammalia
  - - Marsupialia
      - Paucituberculata
      - - Didelphimorphia
        - - Australidelphia
            - Microbiotheria
            - - Diprotodontia
              - - Notoryctemorphia
                - - Dasyuromorphia
                  - Peramelemorphia
    - Placentalia
      - - Xenarthra
          - Cingulata
          - Pilosa
        - Afrotheria
          - - Tubulidentata
            - - Macroscelidea
              - Afrosoricida
          - - Hyracoidea
            - - Proboscidea
              - Sirenia
      - - Euarchontoglires
          - - Scandentia
            - - Dermoptera
              - Primates
          - - Lagomorpha
            - Rodentia
        - Laurasiatheria
          - Eulipotyphla
          - - Chiroptera
            - - - Artiodactyla
                - Perissodactyla
              - - Pholidota
                - Carnivora
  - Monotremata

== Mammals ==
The following classification is based on the taxonomy described by Mammal Species of the World (2005), with augmentation by generally accepted proposals made since using molecular phylogenetic analysis, as supported by both the IUCN and the American Society of Mammalogists.

=== Infraclass Marsupialia ===
Marsupialia distribution (introduced in purple)

Marsupialia is one of the three main divisions of mammals, and contains 334 extant species. It is distinguished from the other two groups in that marsupials give birth to relatively undeveloped young that often reside in a pouch located on their mothers' abdomen for a certain amount of time. It is divided into two groupings: the superorder Australidelphia and Ameridelphia, which was previously considered a superorder but is now regarded as a paraphyletic group. Ameridelphia contains 99 extant species in 2 orders, each containing a single family: Didelphimorphia, or the opossums, and Paucituberculata, or the shrew opossums. Australidelphia contains 235 extant species in 18 families, grouped into 5 orders: Dasyuromorphia, or the Australian carnivorous marsupials; Diprotodontia, or the kangaroos and possums; Microbiotheria, or the monito del montes; and Notoryctemorphia, or the marsupial moles; and Peramelemorphia, or the bandicoots and bilbies. One additional species in Ameridelphia and twelve in Australidelphia were driven extinct in modern times.

==== Ameridelphia ====
===== Didelphimorphia =====
Members of the Didelphimorphia order are called didelphimorphs or opossums. They are found in North and South America, Australia, and southeastern Asia and are omnivorous, eating insects, small vertebrates, and vegetation. Didelphimorphia comprises a single family of 92 extant species in 18 genera. One additional species was driven extinct in modern times.

Not assigned to a named clade – one family
Name	Authority and species	Range	Size and ecology
Didelphidae (opossum)	J. E. Gray, 1821 93 species (1 extinct) in 18 genera: Subfamily Caluromyinae: Caluromys (3 species); Caluromysiops (1 species); Subfamily Didelphinae: Chacodelphys (1 species); Chironectes (1 species); Cryptonanus (5 species (1 extinct)); Didelphis (6 species, Virginia opossum pictured); Gracilinanus (6 species); Lestodelphys (1 species); Lutreolina (2 species); Marmosa (15 species); Marmosops (17 species); Metachirus: (1 species); Monodelphis (17 species); Philander (5 species); Thylamys (9 species); Tlacuatzin (1 species); Subfamily Glironiinae: Glironia (1 species); Subfamily Hyladelphinae: Hyladelphys (1 species)	North America and South America	Size range: 6 cm (2 in) long, plus 3 cm (1 in) tail (pygmy short-tailed opossum) to 50 cm (20 in) long, plus 47 cm (19 in) tail (Virginia opossum) Habitats: Forest, shrubland, grassland, savanna, inland wetlands, and desert Diets: Omnivorous, including insects, other invertebrates, small vertebrates, eggs, seeds, fruit, and nectar

===== Paucituberculata =====
Members of the Paucituberculata order are called paucituberculatans or shrew opossums. They are found in western South America and are omnivorous, eating larva, small vertebrates, and vegetation. Paucituberculata comprises a single family of seven extant species in three genera.

Not assigned to a named clade – one family
Name	Authority and species	Range	Size and ecology
Caenolestidae (shrew opossum)	Trouessart, 1898 7 species in 3 genera: Caenolestes (5 species, eastern caenolestid pictured); Lestoros (1 species); Rhyncholestes (1 species)	Western South America	Size range: 9 cm (4 in) long, plus 10 cm (4 in) tail (Incan caenolestid) to 15 cm (6 in) long, plus 15 cm (6 in) tail (northern caenolestid) Habitats: Forest and shrubland Diets: Invertebrate larvae, small vertebrates, fruit, and vegetation

==== Superorder Australidelphia ====
===== Dasyuromorphia =====
Members of the Dasyuromorphia order are called dasyuromorphs or Australian carnivorous marsupials and include the marsupial shrews and the numbat. They are found in Australia and New Guinea and are carnivorous, eating a wide variety of vertebrates and invertebrates. Dasyuromorphia comprises 2 extant families containing 71 extant species in 17 genera. Two additional species, one of which comprised an entire family, were driven extinct in modern times.

Not assigned to a named clade – three families
Name	Authority and species	Range	Size and ecology
Dasyuridae (marsupial shrew)	Goldfuss, 1820 71 species in 16 genera: Subfamily Dasyurinae: Antechinus (10 species); Dasycercus (2 species, 1 extinct); Dasykaluta (1 species); Dasyuroides (1 species); Dasyurus (6 species); Murexia (5 species); Myoictis (4 species); Neophascogale (1 species); Parantechinus (1 species); Phascogale (3 species); Phascolosorex (2 species); Pseudantechinus (6 species); Sarcophilus (1 species, Tasmanian devil pictured); Subfamily Sminthopsinae: Antechinomys (1 species); Ningaui (3 species); Planigale (5 species); Sminthopsis (18 species)	Australia and New Guinea	Size range: 4 cm (2 in) long, plus 9 cm (4 in) tail (southern ningaui) to 65 cm (26 in) long, plus 26 cm (10 in) tail (Tasmanian devil) Habitats: Forest, savanna, shrubland, grassland, inland wetlands, rocky areas, desert, and caves Diets: Wide variety of vertebrates and invertebrates
Myrmecobiidae (numbat)	Waterhouse, 1841 1 species in 1 genus: Myrmecobius (1 species, numbat pictured)	Scattered Australia	Size: 20–29 cm (8–11 in) long, plus 12–21 cm (5–8 in) tail Habitats: Forest, savanna, shrubland, and desert Diet: Termites and ants, as well as other invertebrates
Thylacinidae † (thylacine)	C. L. Bonaparte, 1838 1 extinct species in 1 genus: Thylacinus † (1 extinct species)	Tasmania	Size range: 123–195 cm (48–77 in) long, plus 50–66 cm (20–26 in) tail Habitats: Forest and grassland Diets: Kangaroos, wallabies, small mammals, and birds

===== Diprotodontia =====
Members of the Diprotodontia order are called diprotodonts and include kangaroos, wallabies, potoroos, possums, the koala, and wombats. They are found in Australia and southeastern Asia and are omnivorous, but primarily eat a wide variety of vegetation and invertebrates. Diprotodontia comprises 11 families containing 139 extant species in 39 genera. These families are divided between three suborders: Macropodiformes, containing the kangaroos, wallabies, and potoroos; Phalangeriformes, or the possums; and Vombatiformes, or the koala and wombats. Nine additional kangaroo and potoroo species were driven extinct in modern times.

Suborder Macropodiformes – Ameghino, 1889 – three families (full list)
Name	Authority and species	Range	Size and ecology
Hypsiprymnodontidae (musky rat-kangaroo)	Collett, 1877 1 species in 1 genera: Hypsiprymnodon (1 species, musky rat-kangaroo pictured)	Northeastern Australia	Size: 15–27 cm (6–11 in) long, plus 12–16 cm (5–6 in) tail Habitats: Forest Diet: Insects and worms, as well as berries and roots
Macropodidae (kangaroo or wallaby)	J. E. Gray, 1821 67 species (4 extinct) in 13 genera: Subfamily Macropodinae (kangaroo or wallaby): Dendrolagus (14 species); Dorcopsis (4 species); Dorcopsulus (2 species); Lagorchestes (4 species (2 extinct)); Macropus (2 species, Eastern gray kangaroo pictured); Notamacropus (8 species (1 extinct)); Osphranter (4 species); Onychogalea (3 species (1 extinct)); Petrogale (16 species); Setonix (1 species); Thylogale (7 species); Wallabia (1 species); Subfamily Sthenurinae (banded hare-wallaby): Lagostrophus (1 species)	Australia and New Guinea	Size range: 29 cm (11 in) long, plus 22 cm (9 in) tail (nabarlek) to 230 cm (91 in) long, plus 109 cm (43 in) tail (eastern grey kangaroo) Habitats: Desert, grassland, forest, shrubland, savanna, inland wetlands, and rocky areas Diets: Wide variety of plant material
Potoroidae (potoroo or rat-kangaroo)	J. E. Gray, 1821 12 species (4 extinct) in 3 genera (1 extinct): Aepyprymnus (1 species); Bettongia (6 species (3 extinct)); Caloprymnus † (1 extinct species); Potorous (4 species (1 extinct), long-nosed potoroo pictured)	Eastern and scattered southern Australia	Size range: 26 cm (10 in) long, plus 18 cm (7 in) tail (long-nosed potoroo) to 34 cm (13 in) long, plus 48 cm (19 in) tail (rufous rat-kangaroo) Habitats: Desert, forest, shrubland, savanna, and inland wetlands Diets: Omnivorous, especially fungi

Suborder Phalangeriformes – Szalay, 1982 – six families (full list)
Name	Authority and species	Range	Size and ecology
Acrobatidae (feather-tailed possum or feather-tailed glider)	Aplin, 1987 2 species in 2 genera: Acrobates (1 species, feathertail glider pictured); Distoechurus (1 species)	Eastern Australia and New Guinea	Size range: 5 cm (2 in) long, plus 6 cm (2 in) tail (feathertail glider) to 11 cm (4 in) long, plus 16 cm (6 in) tail (feather-tailed possum) Habitats: Forest Diets: Flowers, fruit, and invertebrates
Burramyidae (pygmy possum)	Broom, 1989 5 species in 2 genera: Burramys (1 species, mountain pygmy possum pictured); Cercartetus (4 species)	New Guinea and southern and northeastern Australia	Size range: 5 cm (2 in) long, plus 6 cm (2 in) tail (Tasmanian pygmy possum) to 11 cm (4 in) long, plus 14 cm (6 in) tail (mountain pygmy possum) Habitats: Shrubland and forest Diets: Invertebrates and vegetation
Petauridae (possum)	C. L. Bonaparte, 1838 11 species in 3 genera: Dactylopsila (4 species); Gymnobelideus (1 species); Petaurus (6 species, mahogany glider pictured)	New Guinea and northern, eastern, and southern Australia	Size range: 15 cm (6 in) long, plus 15 cm (6 in) tail (Leadbeater's possum) to 31 cm (12 in) long, plus 47 cm (19 in) tail (yellow-bellied glider) Habitats: Forest and savanna Diets: Sap, flowers, nectar, invertebrates, and small vertebrates
Phalangeridae (cuscus)	Thomas, 1888 27 species in 6 genera: Subfamily Ailuropinae: Ailurops (2 species); Subfamily Phalangerinae: Phalanger (13 species, southern common cuscus pictured); Spilocuscus (5 species); Strigocuscus (2 species); Trichosurus (4 species); Wyulda (1 species)	New Guinea, Sulawesi island and nearby islands in Indonesia, and scattered Australia	Size range: 30 cm (12 in) long, plus 28 cm (11 in) tail (scaly-tailed possum) to 69 cm (27 in) long, plus 65 cm (26 in) tail (black-spotted cuscus) Habitats: Forest, savanna, and rocky areas Diets: Leaves, flowers, and fruit, as well as insects and eggs
Pseudocheiridae (ringtail possum)	Winge, 1893 18 species in 6 genera: Subfamily Hemibelideinae (greater glider): Hemibelideus (1 species); Petauroides (1 species); Subfamily Pseudocheirinae (ringtail possum): Petropseudes (1 species); Pseudocheirus (2 species, common ringtail possum pictured); Pseudochirulus (8 species); Subfamily Pseudochiropsinae (false ringtail possum): Pseudochirops (5 species)	New Guinea and northern, eastern, and southern Australia	Size range: 17 cm (7 in) long, plus 15 cm (6 in) tail (pygmy ringtail possum) to 45 cm (18 in) long, plus 60 cm (24 in) tail (southern greater glider) Habitats: Forest, savanna, grassland, and rocky areas Diets: Leaves and fruit
Tarsipedidae (honey possum)	Gervais & Verreaux, 1842 1 species in 1 genus: Tarsipes (1 species, honey possum pictured)	Southwestern Australia	Size: 6–9 cm (2–4 in) long, plus 7–11 cm (3–4 in) tail Habitats: Shrubland Diet: Nectar and pollen

Suborder Vombatiformes – Burnett, 1830 – two families
Name	Authority and species	Range	Size and ecology
Phascolarctidae (koala)	Owen, 1839 1 species in 1 genus: Phascolarctos (1 species, koala pictured)	Southern and eastern Australia	Size: 67–82 cm (26–32 in) long Habitats: Forest and shrubland Diet: Eucalyptus leaves and bark, as well as other leaves
Vombatidae (wombat)	Burnett, 1830 3 species in 2 genera: Lasiorhinus (2 species); Vombatus (1 species, common wombat pictured)	Southern and eastern Australia	Size range: 84 cm (33 in) long, plus 2 cm (1 in) tail (southern hairy-nosed wombat) to 115 cm (45 in) long, with no tail (common wombat) Habitats: Forest, savanna, shrubland, and grassland Diets: Grass, roots, bark, and fungi

===== Microbiotheria =====
Members of the Microbiotheria order are called microbiotherians or monito del montes. They are found in southwestern South America and eat vegetation and invertebrates. Microbiotheria comprises a single family containing two extant species in a single genus.

Not assigned to a named clade – one family
Name	Authority and species	Range	Size and ecology
Microbiotheriidae (monito del monte)	Ameghino, 1889 2 species in 1 genus: Dromiciops (2 species, southern monito del monte pictured)	Southwestern South America	Size range: 8 cm (3 in) long, plus 9 cm (4 in) tail (southern monito del monte) to about 17 cm (7 in) long, plus about 9 cm (4 in) tail (Pancho's monito del monte) Habitats: Forest Diets: Insects and other invertebrates, as well as vegetable matter

===== Notoryctemorphia =====
Members of the Notoryctemorphia order are called notoryctemorphs or marsupial moles. They are found in central Australia and eat insects and seeds. Notoryctemorphia comprises a single family containing two extant species in a single genus.

Not assigned to a named clade – one family
Name	Authority and species	Range	Size and ecology
Notoryctidae (marsupial mole)	Ogilby, 1892 2 species in 1 genus: Notoryctes (2 species, southern marsupial mole pictured)	Central Australia	Size range: 8 cm (3 in) long, plus 1 cm (0.4 in) tail (northern marsupial mole) to 14 cm (6 in) long, plus 3 cm (1 in) tail (southern marsupial mole) Habitats: Shrubland, grassland, and desert Diets: Insects and seeds

===== Peramelemorphia =====
Members of the Peramelemorphia order are called peramelemorphs and include bandicoots and bilbies. They are found in Australia and New Guinea and are omnivorous. Peramelemorphia comprises two families containing 19 extant species in 7 genera. Three additional species, including the sole member of a third family, were driven extinct in modern times.

Not assigned to a named clade – three families
Name	Authority and species	Range	Size and ecology
Chaeropodidae † (pig-footed bandicoot)	Gill, 1872 1 extinct species in 1 genus: Chaeropus † (1 extinct species)	Central and western Australia	Size range: 23–26 cm (9–10 in) long, plus 10–14 cm (4–6 in) tail Habitats: Forest, savanna, shrubland, and grassland Diets: Believed to be omnivorous
Peramelidae (bandicoot)	Gill, 1872 19 species (1 extinct) in 6 genera: Subfamily Echymiperinae (spiny bandicoot): Echymipera (5 species); Microperoryctes (4 species); Rhynchomeles (1 species); Subfamily Peramelinae (bandicoot): Isoodon (3 species, southern brown bandicoot pictured); Perameles (4 species (1 extinct)); Subfamily Peroryctinae (New Guinean long-nosed bandicoot): Peroryctes (2 species)	Australia and New Guinea	Size range: 15 cm (6 in) long, plus 10 cm (4 in) tail (mouse bandicoot) to 44 cm (17 in) long, plus 16 cm (6 in) tail (long-nosed bandicoot) Habitats: Forest, shrubland, savanna, grassland, inland wetlands, and desert Diets: Omnivorous
Thylacomyidae (bilby)	Bensley, 1903 2 species (1 extinct) in 1 genus: Macrotis (2 species (1 extinct), greater bilby pictured)	Western and central Australia	Size range: 33–55 cm (13–22 in) long, plus 20–29 cm (8–11 in) tail (greater bilby) Habitats: Savanna, shrubland, and grassland Diets: Insects, as well as small vertebrates and vegetation

=== Infraclass Placentalia ===
Placentalia is one of the three main divisions of mammals, and contains the vast majority of extant species with 5,783 species. It is distinguished from the other two groups in that the placental animals have fetuses that are carried in the uterus. It is divided into four superorders: Afrotheria, Euarchontoglires, Laurasiatheria, and Xenarthra.

Afrotheria contains 87 extant species in 9 families, grouped into 6 orders: Afrosoricida, the golden moles and tenrecs; Hyracoidea, or hyraxes; Macroscelidea, or elephant shrews; Proboscidea, or elephants; Sirenia, or dugongs and manatees; and Tubulidentata, or aardvarks. Euarchontoglires contains 2,984 extant species in 56 families, grouped into 5 orders: Scandentia, or the treeshrews; Dermoptera, or the colugos; Lagomorpha, containing hares and pikas; Primates, containing monkeys and apes; and Rodentia, or rodents. Laurasiatheria contains 2,683 species in 69 families, grouped into 6 orders: Artiodactyla, containing deer, cattle, pigs, and whales; Carnivora, containing wolves, otters, seals, cats, and mongooses; Chiroptera, or bats; Eulipotyphla, containing hedgehogs, shrews, and moles; Perissodactyla, containing horses, tapirs, and rhinoceroses; and Pholidota, or pangolins. Xenarthra contains 31 species in 6 families, grouped into 2 orders: Cingulata, or armadillos, and Pilosa, the sloths and anteaters. One additional species in Afrotheria, 38 in Euarchontoglires, and 18 in Laurasiatheria were driven extinct in modern times.

==== Superorder Afrotheria ====
===== Afrosoricida =====
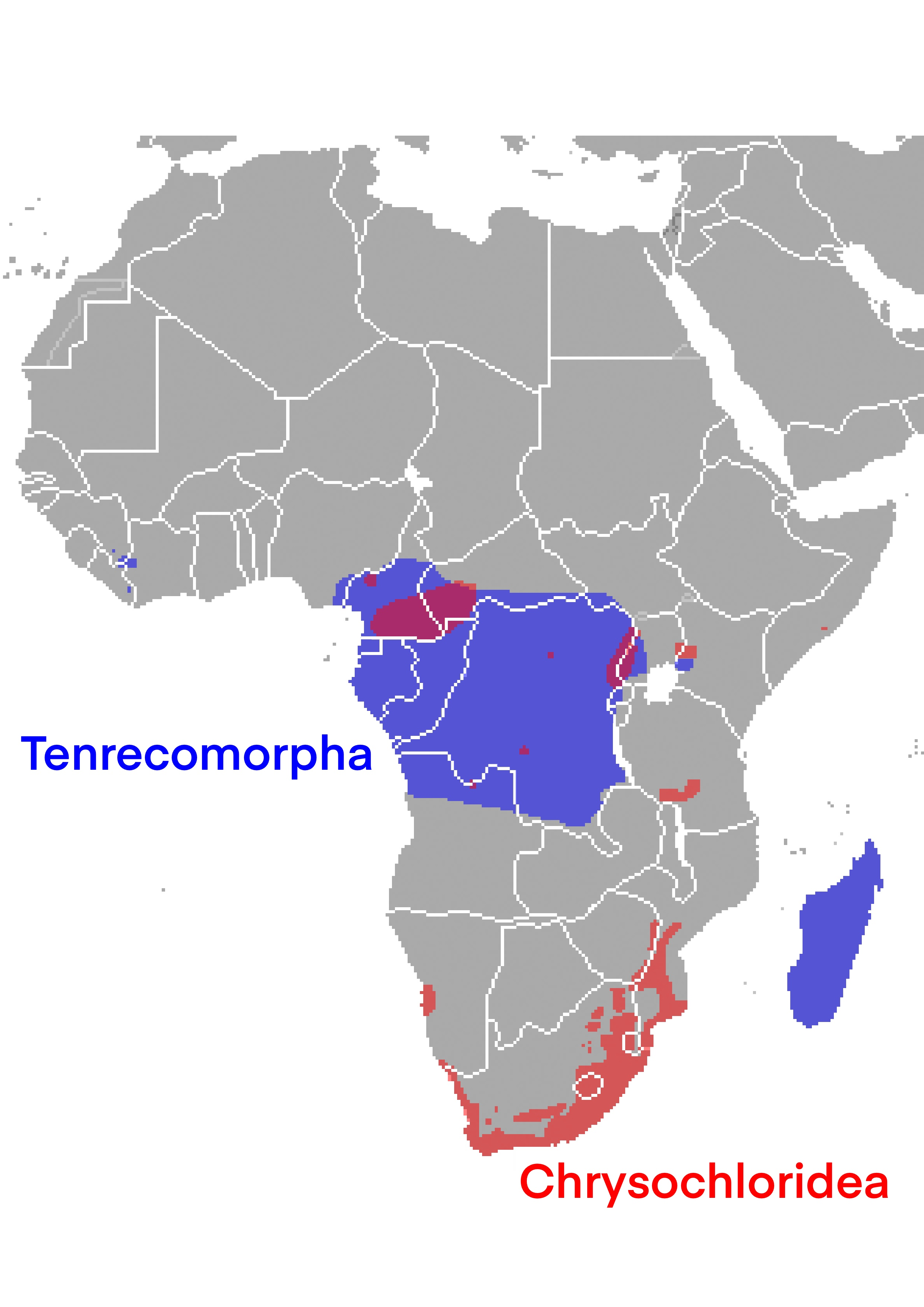
Afrosoricida distribution

Members of the Afrosoricida order are called afrosoricids and include golden moles, otter shrews, and tenrecs. They are found in Sub-Saharan Africa and eat invertebrates, fish, amphibians, lizards, and vegetation. Afrosoricida comprises three families of 55 extant species in 20 genera. These families are divided between two suborders: Chrysochloridea, or the golden moles, and Tenrecomorpha, containing the otter shrews and tenrecs.

Suborder Chrysochloridea – Broom, 1915 – one family
Name	Authority and species	Range	Size and ecology
Chrysochloridae (golden mole)	J. E. Gray, 1825 21 species in 10 genera: Subfamily Chrysochlorinae (golden mole): Carpitalpa (one species); Chlorotalpa (2 species); Chrysochloris (3 species); Chrysospalax (2 species); Cryptochloris (2 species); Eremitalpa (1 species); Subfamily Amblysominae (narrow-headed golden mole): Amblysomus (five species, Hottentot golden mole pictured); Calcochloris (1 species); Huetia (2 species); Neamblysomus (2 species)	Sub-Saharan Africa	Size range: 6 cm (2 in) long, with no tail (Grant's golden mole) to 23 cm (9 in) long, with no tail (giant golden mole) Habitats: Forest, savanna, grassland, shrubland, and desert Diets: Invertebrates, as well as lizards

Suborder Tenrecomorpha – Butler, 1972 – two families
Name	Authority and species	Range	Size and ecology
Potamogalidae (otter shrew)	Allmann, 1865 3 species in 2 genera: Micropotamogale (2 species); Potamogale (1 species, giant otter shrew pictured)	Western and central Africa	Size range: 12 cm (5 in) long, plus 9 cm (4 in) tail (Nimba otter shrew) to 34 cm (13 in) long, plus 29 cm (11 in) tail (giant otter shrew) Habitats: Forest and inland wetlands Diets: Crabs, fish, amphibians, worms, and insects
Tenrecidae (tenrec)	J. E. Gray, 1821 31 species in 8 genera: Subfamily Geogalinae (large-eared tenrec): Geogale (one species); Subfamily Oryzorictinae (shrew tenrec): Microgale (twenty-one species); Nesogale (two species); Oryzorictes (two species); Subfamily Tenrecinae (hedgehog tenrec): Echinops (one species, lesser hedgehog tenrec pictured); Hemicentetes (two species); Setifer (one species); Tenrec (one species)	Madagascar	Size range: 4 cm (2 in) long, plus 4 cm (2 in) tail (pygmy shrew tenrec) to 35 cm (14 in) long, with no tail (tailless tenrec) Habitats: Forest, shrubland, grassland, savanna, and inland wetlands Diets: Invertebrates, as well as frogs, fish, shrimp, worms, and vegetation

===== Hyracoidea =====
Members of the Hyracoidea order are called hyracoids or hyraxes. They are found in Africa and the Middle East and eat a variety of vegetation. Hyracoidea comprises a single family of five extant species in three genera.

Not assigned to a named clade – one family
Name	Authority and species	Range	Size and ecology
Procaviidae (hyrax)	Bonaparte, 1838 5 species in 3 genera: Dendrohyrax (3 species); Heterohyrax (1 species); Procavia (1 species, rock hyrax pictured)	Africa and Middle East	Size range: 32 cm (13 in) long, with no tail (yellow-spotted rock hyrax) to 60 cm (24 in) long, with no tail (southern tree hyrax) Habitats: Forest, savanna, rocky areas, shrubland, and desert Diets: Variety of vegetation

===== Macroscelidea =====
Members of the Macroscelidea order are called macroscelids or elephant shrews. They are found in Africa and eat ants and termites, as well as other insects. Macroscelidea comprises a single family of 19 extant species in 6 genera.

Not assigned to a named clade – one family
Name	Authority and species	Range	Size and ecology
Macroscelididae (elephant shrew)	Bonaparte, 1838 19 species in 6 genera: Elephantulus (8 species); Galegeeska (2 species); Macroscelides (3 species); Petrodromus (1 species); Petrosaltator (1 species); Rhynchocyon (4 species, black and rufous elephant shrew pictured)	Africa	Size range: 8 cm (3 in) long, plus 8 cm (3 in) tail (Etendeka round-eared elephant shrew) to 21 cm (8 in) long, plus 19 cm (7 in) tail (four-toed elephant shrew) Habitats: Savanna, shrubland, grassland, rocky areas, and desert Diets: Ants and termites, as well as other insects

===== Proboscidea =====
Members of the Proboscidea order are called proboscids or elephants. They are found in Sub-Saharan Africa and southern and southeastern Asia and eat grass, bark, roots, leaves, shrubs, and fruit. Proboscidea comprises a single family of three extant species in two genera, in the suborder Elephantiformes.

Suborder Elephantiformes – Tassy, 1988 – one family
Name	Authority and species	Range	Size and ecology
Elephantidae (elephant)	J. E. Gray, 1821 3 species in 2 genera: Elephas (1 species); Loxodonta (2 species, African bush elephant pictured)	Sub-Saharan Africa and southern and southeastern Asia	Size range: 550 cm (18 ft) long, plus 120 cm (4 ft) tail (Asian elephant) to 750 cm (25 ft) long, plus 150 cm (5 ft) tail (African savanna elephant) Habitats: Forest, savanna, shrubland, grassland, inland wetlands, and desert Diets: Grass, bark, roots, leaves, shrubs, and fruit

===== Sirenia =====
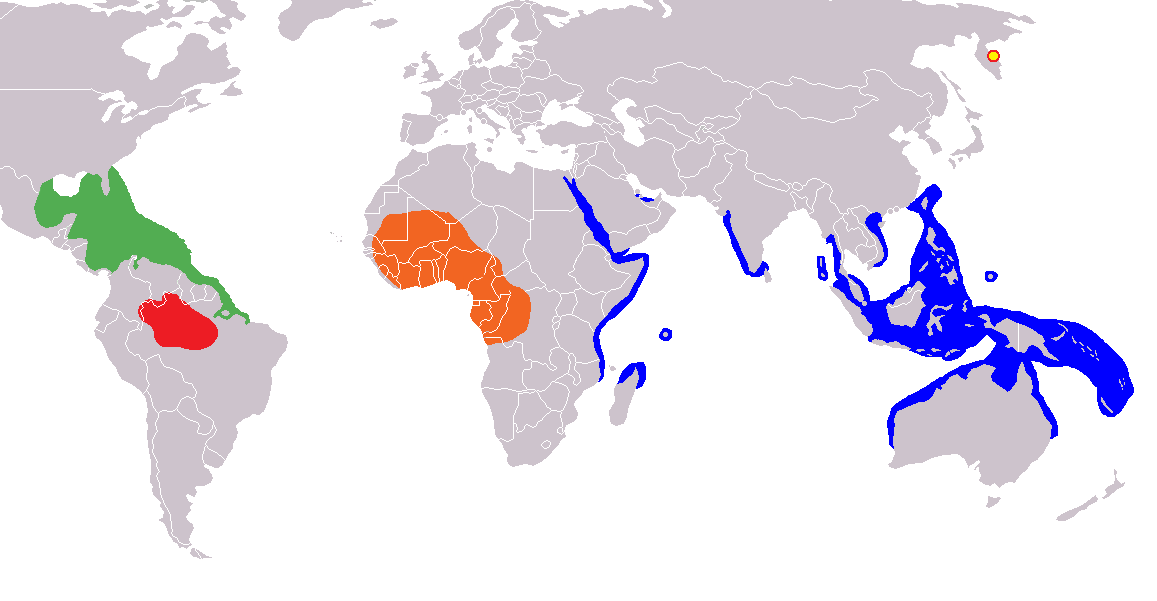
Sirenia distribution

Members of the Sirenia order are called sirenians or sea cows and include dugongs and manatees. They are found in the Indian, Pacific, and western Atlantic Oceans and in South American and western African rivers, and eat aquatic vegetation and algaes, as well as fish and invertebrates. Sirenia comprises two families of four extant species in two genera. Additionally, a single species of dugong was driven extinct in modern times.

Not assigned to a named clade – two families
Name	Authority and species	Range	Size and ecology
Dugongidae (dugong)	J. E. Gray, 1821 2 species (1 extinct) in 2 genera (1 extinct): Subfamily Dugonginae: Dugong (1 species, dugong pictured); Subfamily Hydrodamalinae †: Hydrodamalis † (1 extinct species)	Indian and Pacific Oceans	Size range: 200–330 cm (7–11 ft) long (dugong) Habitats: Neritic marine and intertidal marine Diets: Seagrass, kelp, and other algaes, as well as crabs
Trichechidae (manatee)	Gill, 1872 3 species in 1 genus: Trichechus (3 species, West Indian manatee pictured)	South American and western African rivers and western Atlantic Ocean	Size range: 250–390 cm (98–154 in) long (multiple) Habitats: Inland wetlands, neritic marine, oceanic marine, intertidal marine, coastal marine Diets: Aquatic vegetation, as well as fish and invertebrates

===== Tubulidentata =====
Members of the Tubulidentata order are called tubulidentatans or aardvarks. They are found in Africa and eat termites, as well as other insects and fruit. Tubulidentata is composed of a single species.

Not assigned to a named clade – one family
Name	Authority and species	Range	Size and ecology
Orycteropodidae (aardvark)	J. E. Gray, 1821 1 species in 1 genera: Orycteropus (1 species, aardvark pictured)	Africa	Size: 94–142 cm (37–56 in) long, plus 44–63 cm (17–25 in) tail Habitats: Forest, savanna, shrubland, and grassland Diet: Termites, as well as other insects and fruit

==== Superorder Euarchontoglires ====
===== Scandentia =====
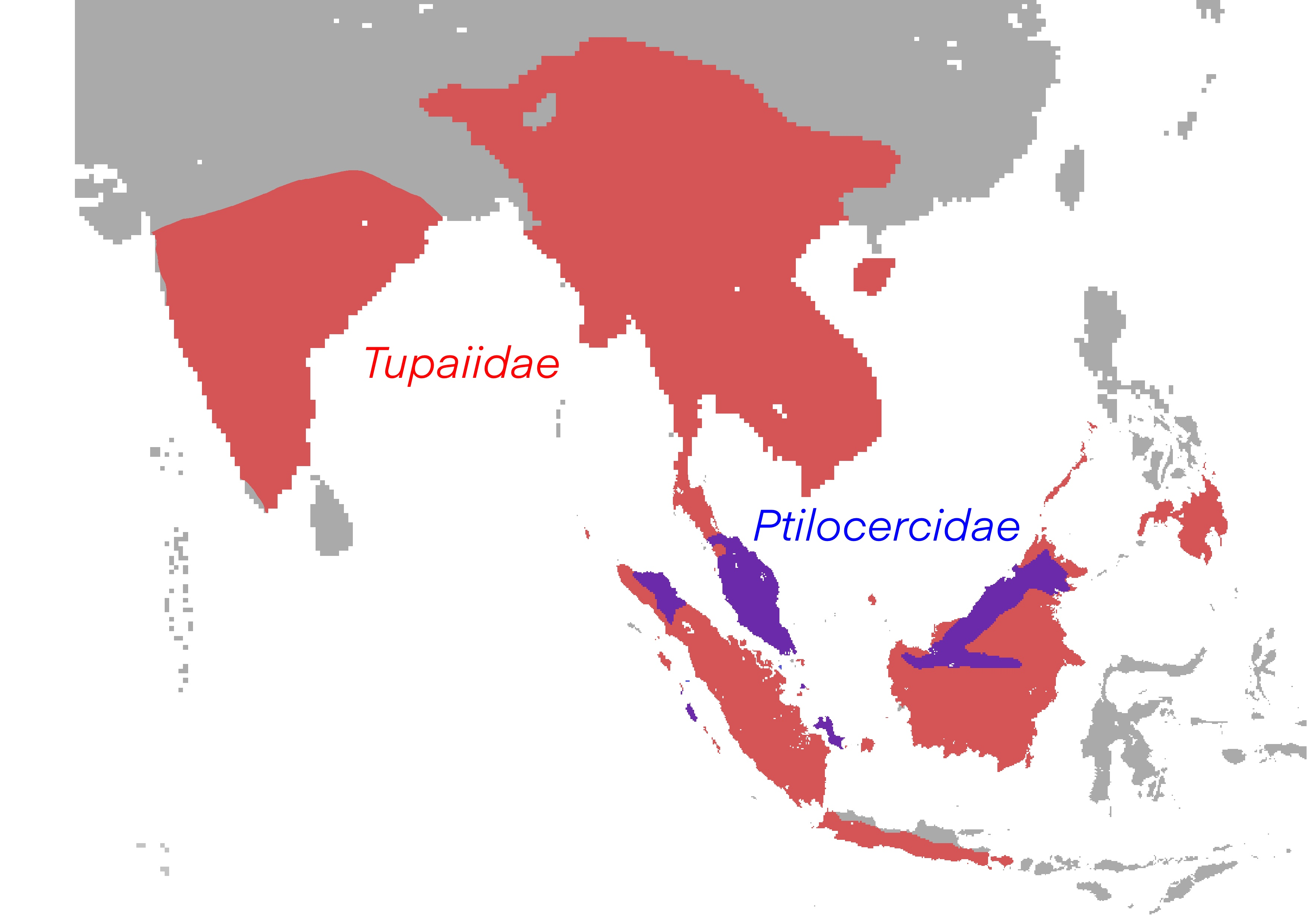
Scandentia distribution

Members of the Scandentia order are called scandentians or treeshrews. They are found in India and southeastern Asia and eat insects and fruit, as well as small animals and plants. Scandentia comprises 2 families of 23 extant species in 4 genera.

Not assigned to a named clade – two families
Name	Authority and species	Range	Size and ecology
Ptilocercidae (pen-tailed treeshrew)	Lyon, 1913 1 species in 1 genera: Ptilocercus (1 species, pen-tailed treeshrew pictured)	Southeastern Asia	Size: 13–15 cm (5–6 in) long, plus 16–20 cm (6–8 in) tail Habitats: Forest Diet: Insects, small vertebrates, and fruit
Tupaiidae (treeshrew)	J. E. Gray, 1825 22 species in 3 genera: Anathana (1 species); Dendrogale (2 species); Tupaia (19 species, Horsfield's treeshrew pictured)	India and southeastern Asia	Size range: 11 cm (4 in) long, plus 11 cm (4 in) tail (northern smooth-tailed treeshrew) to 22 cm (9 in) long, plus 18 cm (7 in) tail (Mindanao treeshrew) Habitats: Forest and shrubland Diets: Insects and fruit, as well as small animals and plants

===== Dermoptera =====
Members of the Dermoptera order are called dermopterans or colugos. They are found in southeastern Asia and eat leaves. Dermoptera comprises a single family of two extant species in two genera.

Not assigned to a named clade – one family
Name	Authority and species	Range	Size and ecology
Cynocephalidae (colugo)	Simpson, 1945 2 species in 2 genera: Cynocephalus (1 species); Galeopterus (1 species, Sunda flying lemur pictured)	Southeastern Asia	Size range: 34–42 cm (13–17 in) long, plus 17–28 cm (7–11 in) tail (both species) Habitats: Forest Diets: Leaves

===== Lagomorpha =====
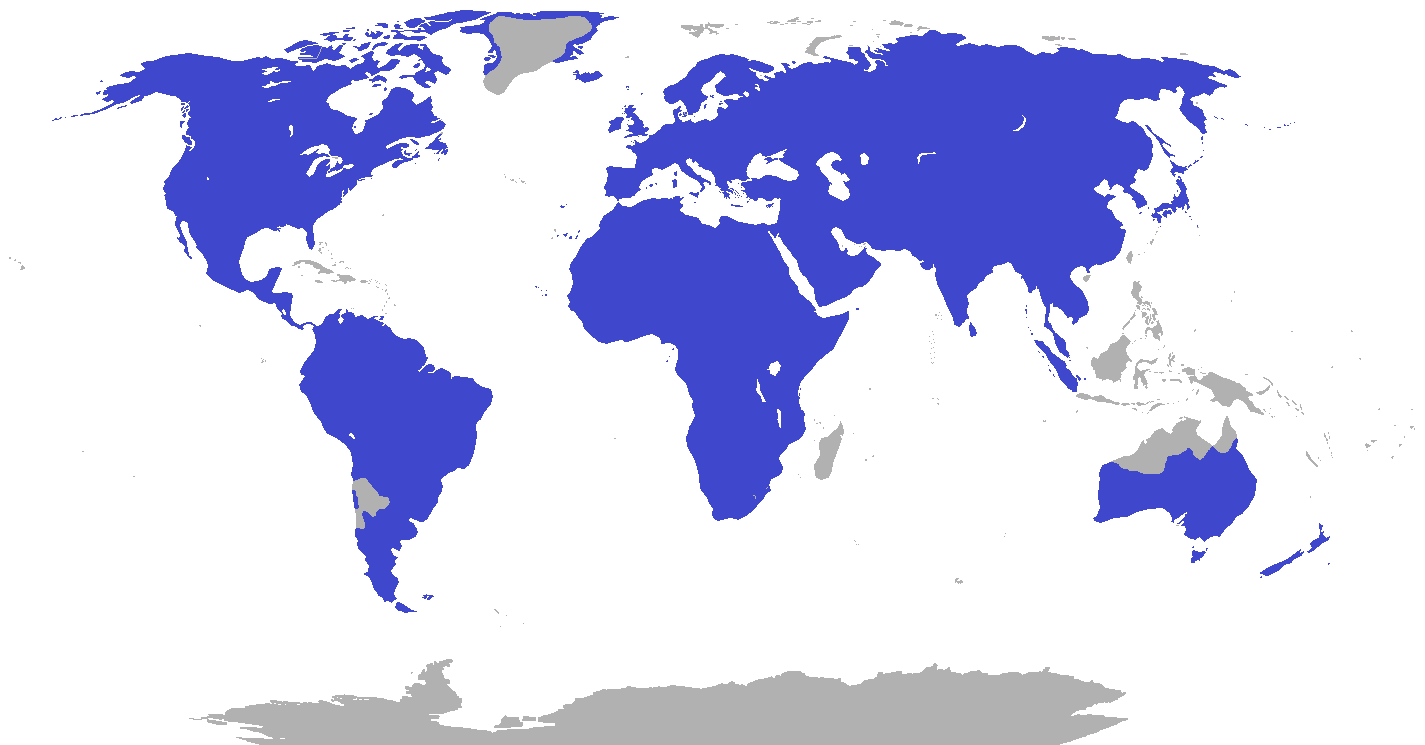
Lagomorpha distribution

Members of the Lagomorpha order are called lagomorphs and include hares, rabbits, and pikas. They are found worldwide and eat a variety of plant material. Lagomorpha comprises 2 families of 93 extant species in 12 genera.

Not assigned to a named clade – two families
Name	Authority and species	Range	Size and ecology
Leporidae (hare or rabbit)	G. Fischer, 1817 64 species in 11 genera (full list): Brachylagus (1 species); Bunolagus (1 species); Caprolagus (1 species); Lepus (32 species); Nesolagus (2 species); Oryctolagus (1 species, European rabbit pictured); Pentalagus (1 species); Poelagus (1 species); Pronolagus (4 species); Romerolagus (1 species); Sylvilagus (19 species)	Worldwide	Size range: 23 cm (9 in) long, plus 1 cm (0.4 in) tail (pygmy rabbit) to 68 cm (27 in) long, plus 14 cm (6 in) tail (European hare) Habitats: Desert, grassland, inland wetlands, forest, shrubland, rocky areas, savanna, caves, coastal marine, and intertidal marine Diets: Variety of plant material
Ochotonidae (pika)	Thomas, 1897 29 species in 1 genus (full list): Ochotona (29 species, American pika pictured)	Asia and western North America	Size range: 11 cm (4 in) long, with no tail (Gansu pika) to 26 cm (10 in) long, with no tail (Turkestan red pika) Habitats: Desert, forest, shrubland, rocky areas, and grassland Diets: Variety of plant material, especially grass and sedges

===== Primates =====
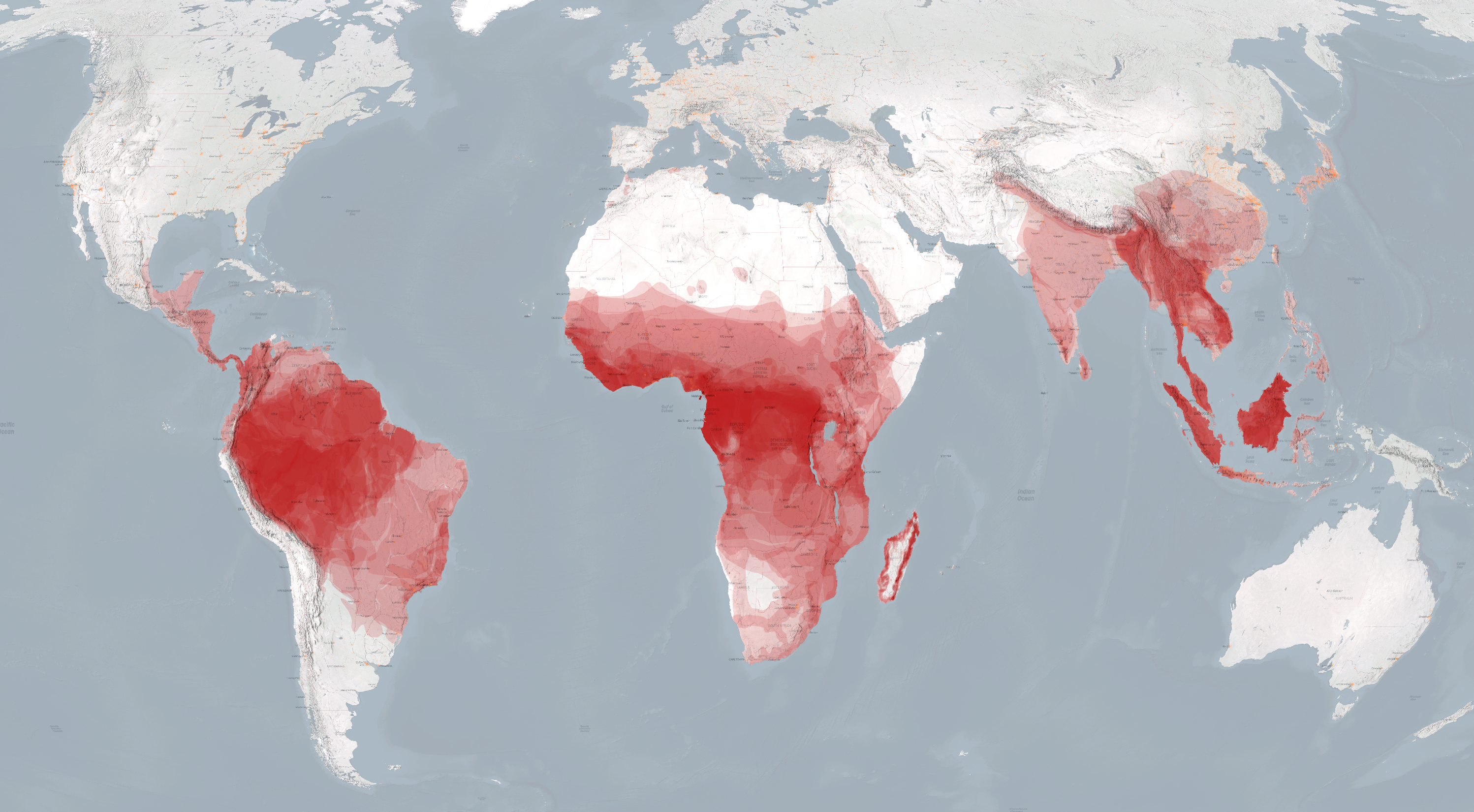
Primates distribution (non-human)

Members of the Primates order are called primates and include monkeys and apes. Excluding humans, they are found in Central and South America, Sub-Saharan Africa, and Asia, and eat a variety of plant material, invertebrates, and small vertebrates. Primates comprises 16 families of 505 extant species in 81 genera. These families are divided between two suborders: Haplorhini, containing the apes, gibbons, New World monkeys, and tarsiers, and Strepsirrhini, containing the lemurs, galagos, and lorises.

Suborder Haplorhini – Pocock, 1918 – nine families
Name	Authority and species	Range	Size and ecology
Aotidae (night monkey)	Poche, 1908 11 species in 1 genus: Aotus (11 species, Panamanian night monkey pictured)	Central and northern South America and Central America	Size range: 29 cm (11 in) long, plus 35 cm (14 in) tail (Nancy Ma's night monkey) to 48 cm (19 in) long, plus 42 cm (17 in) tail (gray-handed night monkey) Habitats: Forest and savanna Diets: Fruit, nuts, leaves, bark, flowers, gums, insects, and small vertebrates
Atelidae (howler, spider, or woolly monkey)	J. E. Gray, 1825 23 species in 4 genera: Subfamily Alouattinae (howler monkey): Alouatta (12 species, black howler pictured); Subfamily Atelinae (spider or woolly monkey): Ateles (7 species); Brachyteles (2 species); Lagothrix (2 species)	South America and Central America	Size range: 30 cm (12 in) long, plus 66 cm (26 in) tail (black-headed spider monkey) to 71 cm (28 in) long, plus 60 cm (24 in) tail (Bolivian red howler) Habitats: Forest and savanna Diets: Fruit, leaves, seeds, insects, nuts, arachnids, nectar, flowers, and eggs
Callitrichidae (marmoset or tamarin)	Thomas, 1903 43 species in 7 genera: Callimico (1 species); Callithrix (6 species); Cebuella (2 species); Leontocebus (7 species); Leontopithecus (4 species, golden-headed lion tamarin pictured); Mico (16 species); Saguinus (17 species)	South America and Central America	Size range: 12 cm (5 in) long, plus 17 cm (7 in) tail (western pygmy marmoset) to 34 cm (13 in) long, plus 40 cm (16 in) tail (Superagüi lion tamarin) Habitats: Forest, shrubland, and savanna Diets: Insects, fruit, nectar, and gums
Cebidae (capuchin or squirrel monkey)	Bonaparte, 1831 18 species in 3 genera: Subfamily Cebinae (capuchin monkey): Cebus (4 species); Sapajus (7 species, tufted capuchin pictured); Subfamily Saimiriinae (squirrel monkey): Saimiri (7 species)	South America and southern Central America	Size range: 22 cm (9 in) long, plus 35 cm (14 in) tail (black squirrel monkey) to 56 cm (22 in) long, plus 56 cm (22 in) tail (black capuchin) Habitats: Forest, shrubland, and savanna Diets: Fruit, nuts, seeds, flowers, shoots, bark, gums, eggs, invertebrates, and small vertebrates
Cercopithecidae (Old World monkey)	J. E. Gray, 1821 158 species in 23 genera: Subfamily Cercopithecinae (cercopithecine monkey): Allenopithecus (1 species); Allochrocebus (3 species); Cercocebus (7 species); Cercopithecus (19 species); Chlorocebus (7 species); Erythrocebus (3 species); Macaca (24 species); Mandrillus (2 species); Miopithecus (2 species); Papio (6 species, olive baboon pictured); Rungwecebus (1 species); Theropithecus (1 species); Subfamily Colobinae (leaf-eating monkey): Colobus (5 species); Nasalis (1 species); Piliocolobus (16 species); Presbytis (19 species); Procolobus (1 species); Pygathrix (3 species); Rhinopithecus (5 species); Semnopithecus (8 species); Simias (1 species); Trachypithecus (21 species)	Sub-Saharan Africa and southern, southeastern, and eastern Asia	Size range: 26 cm (10 in) long, plus 53 cm (21 in) tail (Angolan talapoin) to 100 cm (39 in) long, plus 84 cm (33 in) tail (Chacma baboon) Habitats: Inland wetlands, rocky areas, shrubland, savanna, grassland, forest, intertidal marine, and caves Diets: Fruit, leaves, a variety of vegetation, invertebrates, mushrooms, eggs, and small vertebrates
Hominidae (great ape)	J. E. Gray, 1825 8 species in 4 genera: Subfamily Homininae (African hominid): Gorilla (2 species, western gorilla pictured); Homo (1 species); Pan (2 species); Subfamily Ponginae (orangutans): Pongo (3 species)	Western and central Africa and southeastern Asia, plus humans worldwide	Size range: 60 cm (24 in) long, with no tail (bonobo) to 120 cm (47 in) long, with no tail (eastern gorilla) Habitats: Forest and savanna (excluding humans) Diets: Fruit and leaves, as well as other vegetation, insects, and small vertebrates (excluding humans)
Hylobatidae (gibbon)	J. E. Gray, 1870 29 species in 4 genera: Hoolock (3 species); Hylobates (9 species, lar gibbon pictured); Nomascus (7 species); Symphalangus (1 species)	Southeastern Asia	Size range: 41 cm (16 in) long, with no tail (lar gibbon) to 90 cm (35 in) long, with no tail (siamang) Habitats: Forest Diets: Leaves and fruit, as well as flowers, insects, and small vertebrates
Pitheciidae (titi or saki monkey)	Mivart, 1865 58 species in 6 genera: Subfamily Callicebinae (titi monkey): Callicebus (5 species, black-fronted titi pictured); Cheracebus (5 species); Plecturocebus (23 species); Subfamily Pitheciinae (saki monkey): Cacajao (7 species); Chiropotes (5 species); Pithecia (13 species)	Northern and central South America	Size range: 23 cm (9 in) long, plus 42 cm (17 in) tail (Colombian black-handed titi monkey) to 57 cm (22 in) long, plus 19 cm (7 in) tail (bald uakari) Habitats: Forest, shrubland, and savanna Diets: Fruit, honey, leaves, flowers, invertebrates, and small vertebrates
Tarsiidae (tarsier)	J. E. Gray, 1825 14 species in 3 genera: Carlito (1 species); Cephalopachus (1 species); Tarsius (12 species, Gursky's spectral tarsier pictured)	Southeastern Asia	Size range: 9 cm (4 in) long, plus 20 cm (8 in) tail (pygmy tarsier) to 15 cm (6 in) long, plus 31 cm (12 in) tail (Sangihe tarsier) Habitats: Inland wetlands, forest, and caves Diets: Insects, as well as small vertebrates

Suborder Strepsirrhini – É. Geoffroy, 1812 – seven families
Name	Authority and species	Range	Size and ecology
Cheirogaleidae (dwarf or mouse lemur)	J. E. Gray, 1873 41 species in 5 genera: Allocebus (1 species); Cheirogaleus (10 species); Microcebus (24 species, pygmy mouse lemur pictured); Mirza (2 species); Phaner (4 species)	Madagascar	Size range: 8 cm (3 in) long, plus 14 cm (6 in) tail (Gerp's mouse lemur) to 29 cm (11 in) long, plus 37 cm (15 in) tail (pale fork-marked lemur) Habitats: Forest and shrubland Diets: Insects, spiders, fruit, flowers, nectar, gums, resins, leaves, frogs, lizards, birds, and eggs
Daubentoniidae (aye-aye)	J. E. Gray, 1863 1 species in 1 genus: Daubentonia (1 species, aye-aye pictured)	Western and eastern Madagascar	Size: 30–37 cm (12–15 in) long, plus 44–53 cm (17–21 in) tail Habitats: Forest and shrubland Diet: Insects, coconuts, and gums
Galagidae (galago)	J. E. Gray, 1825 19 species in 6 genera: Euoticus (2 species); Galago (4 species, Senegal bushbaby pictured); Galagoides (3 species); Otolemur (2 species); Paragalago (5 species); Sciurocheirus (3 species)	Sub-Saharan Africa	Size range: 9 cm (4 in) long, plus 16 cm (6 in) tail (Rondo dwarf galago) to 40 cm (16 in) long, plus 50 cm (20 in) tail (brown greater galago) Habitats: Forest, shrubland, and savanna Diets: Gums, insects and fruit
Indriidae (woolly lemur)	Burnett, 1828 19 species in 3 genera: Avahi (9 species); Indri (1 species); Propithecus (9 species, Von der Decken's sifaka pictured)	Madagascar	Size range: 23 cm (9 in) long, plus 26 cm (10 in) tail (Sambirano woolly lemur) to 72 cm (28 in) long, plus 5 cm (2 in) tail (indri) Habitats: Forest, shrubland, and savanna Diets: Leaves, buds, fruit, nuts, bark, and flowers
Lemuridae (true lemur)	J. E. Gray, 1821 21 species in 5 genera: Eulemur (12 species, blue-eyed black lemur pictured); Hapalemur (5 species); Lemur (1 species); Prolemur (1 species); Varecia (2 species)	Madagascar	Size range: 27 cm (11 in) long, plus 36 cm (14 in) tail (western lesser bamboo lemur) to 55 cm (22 in) long, plus 65 cm (26 in) tail (red ruffed lemur) Habitats: Forest, shrubland, rocky areas, inland wetlands, and caves Diets: Fruit, leaves, other vegetation, and insects, as well as bark and nectar
Lepilemuridae (sportive lemur)	J. E. Gray, 1870 25 species in 1 genus: Lepilemur (25 species, Hubbard's sportive lemur pictured)	Madagascar	Size range: 18 cm (7 in) long, plus 25 cm (10 in) tail (northern sportive lemur) to 34 cm (13 in) long, plus 29 cm (11 in) tail (Holland's sportive lemur) Habitats: Forest Diets: Leaves and flowers
Lorisidae (loris or potto)	J. E. Gray, 1821 16 species in 5 genera: Subfamily Lorisinae (loris): Loris (2 species, red slender loris pictured); Nycticebus (8 species); Xanthonycticebus (1 species); Subfamily Perodicticinae (potto): Arctocebus (2 species); Perodicticus (3 species)	Western and central Africa and southern and southeastern Asia	Size range: 18 cm (7 in) long, plus vestigial tail (red slender loris) to 40 cm (16 in) long, plus 10 cm (4 in) tail (Central African potto) Habitats: Forest Diets: Insects and fruit, as well as shoots, leaves, eggs, mollusks, and small vertebrates

===== Rodentia =====
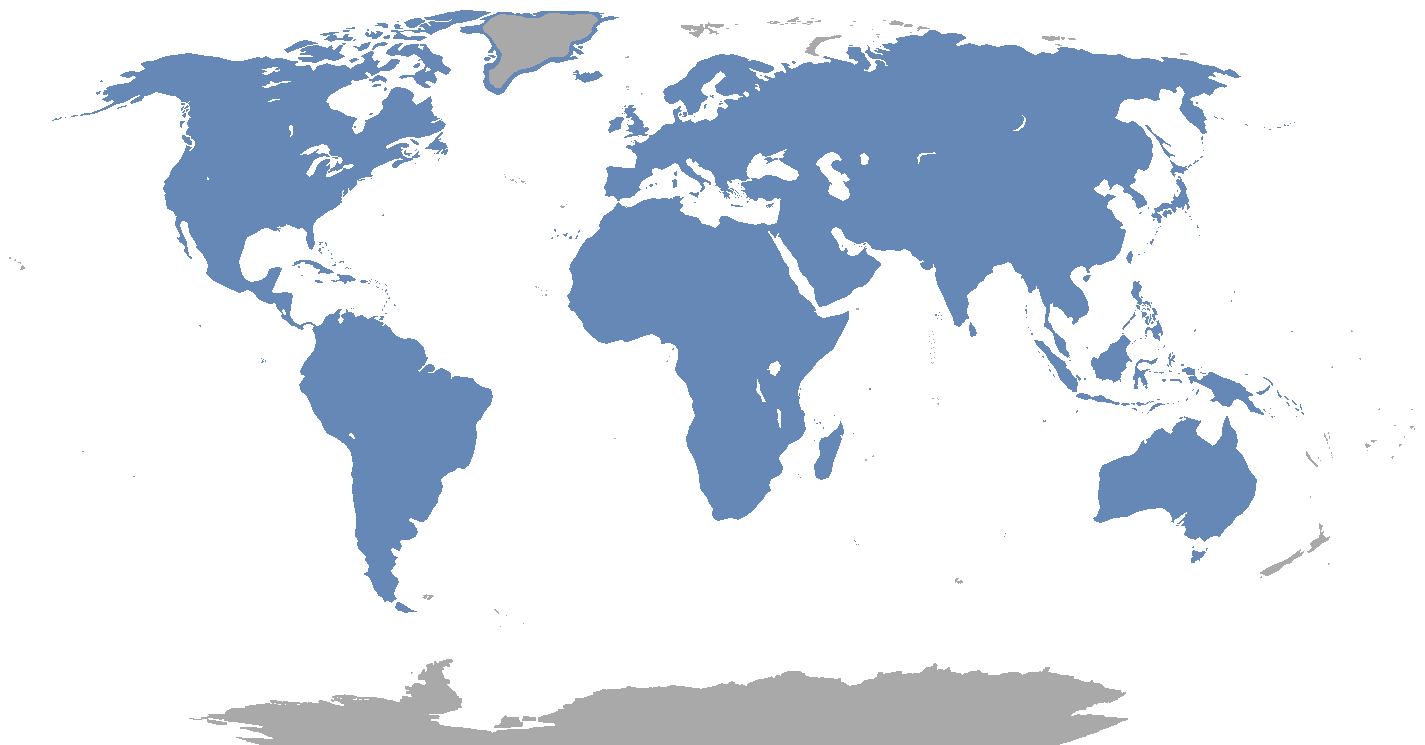
Rodentia distribution

Members of the Rodentia order are called rodents. They are found worldwide, and eat a wide variety of plant material and invertebrates, with some species eating small vertebrates or carrion. Rodentia comprises 35 families of 2,362 extant species—about 40% of all mammal species—in 513 genera. These families are grouped into five suborders: Anomaluromorpha, containing the scaly-tailed squirrels and springhares; Castorimorpha, containing breavers, gophers, and kangaroo rats; Hystricomorpha, containing mole-rats, cavies, tuco-tucos, agoutis, and New World spiny rats and porcupines; Myomorpha, containing a wide variety of mice and rats; and Sciuromorpha, containing dormice and squirrels. Additionally, 38 species have been driven to extinction in modern times.

Suborder Anomaluromorpha – Bugge, 1974 – two families
Name	Authority and species	Range	Size and ecology
Anomaluridae (scaly-tailed squirrel)	Gervais, 1849 7 species in 3 genera: Anomalurus (4 species); Idiurus (2 species, long-eared flying mouse pictured); Zenkerella (1 species)	Sub-Saharan Africa	Size range: 6 cm (2 in) long, plus 7 cm (3 in) tail (pygmy scaly-tailed flying squirrel) to 46 cm (18 in) long, plus 45 cm (18 in) tail (Lord Derby's scaly-tailed squirrel) Habitats: Forest and savanna Diets: Fruit and bark, as well as flowers, leaves, nuts, and insects
Pedetidae (springhare)	J. E. Gray, 1825 2 species in 1 genus: Pedetes (2 species, South African springhare pictured)	Southern and eastern Africa	Size range: 34–46 cm (13–18 in) long, plus 39–48 cm (15–19 in) tail (both species) Habitats: Savanna, shrubland, and grassland Diets: Bulbs and roots, as well as stems, grain, and insects

Suborder Castorimorpha – Wood, 1955 – three families
Name	Authority and species	Range	Size and ecology
Castoridae (beaver)	Hemprich, 1820 2 species in 1 genus: Castor (2 species, North American beaver pictured)	North America, Europe, and Asia	Size range: 80–90 cm (31–35 in) long, plus 20–30 cm (8–12 in) tail (both species) Habitats: Forest, shrubland, and inland wetlands Diets: Bark, cambium, twigs, leaves, and roots of trees and shrubs
Geomyidae (gopher)	Bonaparte, 1845 36 species in 7 genera (full list): Cratogeomys (7 species); Geomys (9 species, Attwater's pocket gopher pictured); Heterogeomys (3 species); Orthogeomys (6 species); Pappogeomys (1 species); Thomomys (9 species); Zygogeomys (1 species)	North America and Central America	Size range: 8 cm (3 in) long, plus 5 cm (2 in) tail (Botta's pocket gopher) to 30 cm (12 in) long, plus 14 cm (6 in) tail (giant pocket gopher) Habitats: Inland wetlands, grassland, shrubland, savanna, forest, intertidal marine, and desert Diets: Roots, tubers, and stems
Heteromyidae (kangaroo rat or pocket mouse)	J. E. Gray, 1868 63 species in 5 genera (full list): Subfamily Dipodomyinae (kangaroo rat): Dipodomys (20 species, Heermann's kangaroo rat pictured); Microdipodops (2 species); Subfamily Heteromyinae (spiny pocket mouse): Heteromys (14 species); Subfamily Perognathinae (pocket mouse): Chaetodipus (18 species); Perognathus (9 species)	North America, Central America, and northern South America	Size range: 5 cm (2 in) long, plus 4 cm (2 in) tail (Merriam's pocket mouse) to 17 cm (7 in) long, plus 20 cm (8 in) tail (Nelson's spiny pocket mouse) Habitats: Rocky areas, shrubland, savanna, grassland, coastal marine, desert, and forest Diets: Seeds and vegetation, as well as insects and other invertebrates

Suborder Hystricomorpha – Brandt, 1855 – eighteen families
Name	Authority and species	Range	Size and ecology
Abrocomidae (chinchilla rat)	Miller & Gidley, 1918 10 species in 2 genera: Abrocoma (8 species, Bennett's chinchilla rat pictured); Cuscomys (2 species)	Western South America	Size range: 15 cm (6 in) long, plus 5 cm (2 in) tail (ashy chinchilla rat) to 35 cm (14 in) long, plus 26 cm (10 in) tail (Asháninka arboreal chinchilla rat) Habitats: Shrubland, inland wetlands, forest, rocky areas, grassland, and savanna Diets: Variety of vegetation
Bathyergidae (mole-rat)	Waterhouse, 1841 21 species in 5 genera (full list): Bathyergus (2 species); Cryptomys (4 species, common mole-rat pictured); Fukomys (13 species); Georychus (1 species); Heliophobius (1 species)	Sub-Saharan Africa	Size range: 8 cm (3 in) long, plus 1 cm (0.4 in) tail (Caroline's mole-rat) to 35 cm (14 in) long, plus 4 cm (2 in) tail (Cape dune mole-rat) Habitats: Grassland, savanna, forest, shrubland, caves, and desert Diets: Tubers, roots, bulbs, and aloe leaves, as well as insects
Capromyidae (hutia)	Waterhouse, 1841 18 species (8 extinct) in 9 genera (4 extinct) (full list): Subfamily Capromyinae (hutia): Capromys (1 species, Desmarest's hutia pictured); Geocapromys (4 species); Mesocapromys (5 species); Mysateles (1 species); Subfamily Hexolobodontinae † (imposter hutia): Hexolobodon † (1 extinct species); Subfamily Isolobodontinae † (laminar-toothed hutia): Isolobodon † (2 extinct species); Subfamily Plagiodontinae (Hispaniolan hutia): Hyperplagiodontia † (1 extinct species); Plagiodontia (2 species (1 extinct)); Rhizoplagiodontia † (1 extinct species)	Caribbean	Size range: 20 cm (8 in) long, plus 17 cm (7 in) tail (dwarf hutia) to 62 cm (24 in) long, plus 31 cm (12 in) tail (Desmarest's hutia) Habitats: Shrubland, intertidal marine, forest, inland wetlands, caves, and rocky areas Diets: Vegetation and small animals
Caviidae (guinea pig or cavy)	G. Fischer, 1818 21 species in 6 genera (full list): Subfamily Caviinae (guinea pig or cavy): Cavia (7 species); Galea (5 species); Microcavia (3 species); Subfamily Dolichotinae (mara): Dolichotis (2 species); Subfamily Hydrochoerinae (capybara or rock cavy): Hydrochoerus (2 species, capybara pictured); Kerodon (2 species)	Panama and South America	Size range: 19 cm (7 in) long, with no tail (Shipton's mountain cavy) to 134 cm (53 in) long, plus 2 cm (1 in) tail (capybara) Habitats: Grassland, forest, rocky areas, savanna, shrubland, desert, and inland wetlands Diets: Variety of plant material
Chinchillidae (chinchilla or viscacha)	Bennett, 1833 7 species (1 extinct) in 3 genera: Chinchilla (2 species); Lagidium (3 species, southern viscacha pictured); Lagostomus (2 species (1 extinct))	Western and southern South America	Size range: 22 cm (9 in) long, plus 14 cm (6 in) tail (long-tailed chinchilla) to 61 cm (24 in) long, plus 20 cm (8 in) tail (plains viscacha) Habitats: Grassland, shrubland, savanna, and rocky areas Diets: Grass, seeds, lichen, and moss, as well as other vegetation
Ctenodactylidae (gundi)	Gervais, 1853 5 species in 4 genera: Ctenodactylus (2 species, common gundi pictured); Felovia (1 species); Massoutiera (1 species); Pectinator (1 species)	Northern and eastern Africa	Size range: 12 cm (5 in) long, plus 2 cm (1 in) tail (Val's gundi) to 23 cm (9 in) long, plus 5 cm (2 in) tail (common gundi) Habitats: Savanna, shrubland, grassland, and rocky areas Diets: Leaves, stalks, seeds, and flowers
Ctenomyidae (tuco-tuco)	Lesson, 1842 61 species in 1 genus (full list): Ctenomys (61 species, silky tuco-tuco pictured)	Southern South America	Size range: 11 cm (4 in) long, plus 7 cm (3 in) tail (white-toothed tuco-tuco) to 33 cm (13 in) long, plus 11 cm (4 in) tail (Conover's tuco-tuco) Habitats: Forest, desert, grassland, inland wetlands, coastal marine, shrubland, and savanna Diets: Grass, roots, stems, and other vegetation
Cuniculidae (paca)	Miller & Gidley, 1918 2 species in 1 genus: Cuniculus (2 species, lowland paca pictured)	Mexico, Cuba, Central America, and South America	Size range: 50 cm (20 in) long, plus 1 cm (0.4 in) tail (lowland paca) to 80 cm (31 in) long, plus 3 cm (1 in) tail (mountain paca) Habitats: Forest and inland wetlands Diets: Leaves, stems, roots, seeds, and fruit
Dasyproctidae (agouti or acouchi)	J. E. Gray, 1825 15 species in 2 genera (full list): Dasyprocta (13 species, Central American agouti pictured); Myoprocta (2 species)	Mexico, Cuba, Central America, and South America	Size range: 30 cm (12 in) long, plus 4 cm (2 in) tail (green acouchi) to 76 cm (30 in) long, plus 4 cm (2 in) tail (black agouti) Habitats: Savanna and forest Diets: Fruit and seeds, as well as crabs
Diatomyidae (Laotian rock rat)	Mein & Ginsburg, 1997 1 species in 1 genus: Laonastes (1 species, Laotian rock rat pictured)	Laos and Vietnam	Size: 21–30 cm (8–12 in) long, plus 12–17 cm (5–7 in) tail Habitats: Forest and rocky areas Diet: Leaves, grass, and seeds
Dinomyidae (pacarana)	Peters, 1873 1 species in 1 genus: Dinomys (1 species, pacarana pictured)	Northwestern South America	Size: 73–79 cm (29–31 in) long, plus 14–23 cm (6–9 in) tail (plains viscacha) Habitats: Forest and grassland Diet: Fruit, leaves, and stems
Echimyidae (Neotropical spiny rat)	Peters, 1873 94 species (6 extinct) in 26 genera (3 extinct) (full list): Subfamily Carterodontinae (Owl's spiny rat): Carterodon (1 species); Subfamily Echimyinae (tree-rat, bamboo rat, or brush-tailed rat): Callistomys (1 species); Dactylomys (3 species); Diplomys (2 species); Echimys (3 species); Hoplomys (1 species); Isothrix (6 species); Kannabateomys (1 species); Lonchothrix (1 species); Makalata (3 species, Brazilian spiny tree-rat pictured); Mesomys (4 species); Myocastor (1 species); Olallamys (2 species); Pattonomys (5 species); Phyllomys (13 species); Proechimys (22 species); Santamartamys (1 species); Thrichomys (4 species); Toromys (2 species); Subfamily Euryzygomatomyinae (Atlantic spiny rats): Clyomys (1 species); Euryzygomatomys (1 species); Trinomys (10 species); Subfamily Heteropsomyinae † (cave rat): Boromys † (2 extinct species); Brotomys † (2 extinct species); Heteropsomys † (2 extinct species)	South America and Central America (introduced in North America, Europe, and Japan)	Size range: 12 cm (5 in) long, plus 13 cm (5 in) tail (Sao Lourenço punaré) to 57 cm (22 in) long, plus 40 cm (16 in) tail (nutria) Habitats: Forest, grassland, savanna, shrubland, inland wetlands, and rocky areas Diets: Grass, sugarcane, fruit, and nuts
Erethizontidae (New World porcupine)	Bonaparte, 1845 18 species in 3 genera (full list): Subfamily Chaetomyinae (bristle-spined rat): Chaetomys (1 species); Subfamily Erethizontinae (porcupine): Coendou (16 species, Paraguaian hairy dwarf porcupine pictured); Erethizon (1 species)	North America and South America	Size range: 24 cm (9 in) long, plus 9 cm (4 in) tail (Paraguaian hairy dwarf porcupine) to 130 cm (51 in) long, plus 25 cm (10 in) tail (American porcupine) Habitats: Forest, shrubland, savanna, and grassland Diets: Leaves, stems, fruit, flowers, roots, seeds, nuts, and other vegetation
Heterocephalidae (naked mole-rat)	Landry, 1957 1 species in 1 genus: Heterocephalus (1 species, naked mole-rat pictured)	Eastern Africa	Size: 7–11 cm (3–4 in) long, plus 3–5 cm (1–2 in) tail Habitats: Savanna, shrubland, grassland, and caves Diet: Tubers, roots, and corms
Hystricidae (Old World porcupine)	G. Fischer, 1817 11 species in 3 genera (full list): Atherurus (2 species); Hystrix (8 species, Indian crested porcupine pictured); Trichys (1 species)	Africa, Italy, and Asia	Size range: 35 cm (14 in) long, plus 17 cm (7 in) tail (long-tailed porcupine) to 93 cm (37 in) long, plus 17 cm (7 in) tail (multiple in Hystrix) Habitats: Forest, grassland, shrubland, rocky areas, and savanna Diets: Vegetation, as well as carrion
Octodontidae (degu or viscacha rat)	Waterhouse, 1839 14 species in 7 genera (full list): Aconaemys (3 species); Octodon (3 species, common degu pictured); Octodontomys (1 species); Octomys (1 species); Pipanacoctomys (1 species); Spalacopus (1 species); Tympanoctomys (3 species)	Southern South America	Size range: 11 cm (4 in) long, plus 4 cm (2 in) tail (coruro) to 33 cm (13 in) long, plus 18 cm (7 in) tail (mountain viscacha rat) Habitats: Forest, grassland, shrubland, shrublands, rocky areas, and inland wetlands Diets: Bulbs, tubers, bark, and cacti
Petromuridae (dassie rat)	Tullberg, 1899 1 species in 1 genus: Petromus (1 species, dassie rat pictured)	Southwestern Africa	Size: 13–22 cm (5–9 in) long, plus 11–18 cm (4–7 in) tail Habitats: Shrubland and rocky areas Diet: Variety of green plant material, seeds, and berries
Thryonomyidae (cane rat)	Pocock, 1922 2 species in 1 genus: Thryonomys (2 species, greater cane rat pictured)	Sub-Saharan Africa	Size range: 41 cm (16 in) long, plus 11 cm (4 in) tail (lesser cane rat) to 77 cm (30 in) long, plus 20 cm (8 in) tail (greater cane rat) Habitats: Shrubland, grassland, inland wetlands, and forest Diets: Grass and cane, as well as bark, nuts, fruit, and crops

Suborder Myomorpha – Brandt, 1855 – nine families
Name	Authority and species	Range	Size and ecology
Calomyscidae (mouse-like hamster)	Vorontsov & Potapova, 1979 8 species in 1 genus: Calomyscus (8 species, Urar mouse-like hamster pictured)	Central Asia	Size range: 6 cm (2 in) long, plus 5 cm (2 in) tail (Tsolov's mouse-like hamster) to 10 cm (4 in) long, plus 11 cm (4 in) tail (Great Balkhan mouse-like hamster) Habitats: Shrubland, grassland and rocky areas Diets: Seeds, flowers, and leaves, as well as animal matter
Cricetidae (New World rat or mouse)	G. Fischer, 1817 705 species (11 extinct) in 146 genera (3 extinct) (full lists): Subfamily Arvicolinae (vole, lemming, or muskrat, full list): Alexandromys (11 species); Alticola (12 species); Arborimus (3 species); Arvicola (3 species); Caryomys (2 species); Chionomys (3 species); Clethrionomys (5 species); Craseomys (6 species); Dicrostonyx (8 species); Dinaromys (1 species); Ellobius (5 species); Eolagurus (2 species); Eothenomys (8 species); Hyperacrius (2 species); Lagurus (2 species); Lasiopodomys (2 species); Lemmiscus (1 species); Lemmus (5 species); Microtus (57 species, eastern meadow vole pictured); Myopus (1 species); Neodon (6 species); Neofiber (1 species); Ondatra (1 species); Phaiomys (1 species); Phenacomys (2 species); Proedromys (2 species); Prometheomys (1 species); Stenocranius (2 species); Synaptomys (2 species); Volemys (2 species); Subfamily Cricetinae (hamster, full list): Allocricetulus (2 species); Cansumys (1 species); Cricetulus (3 species); Cricetus (1 species); Mesocricetus (4 species); Nothocricetulus (1 species); Phodopus (3 species); Tscherskia (1 species); Urocricetus (2 species); Subfamily Neotominae (deer mouse, packrat, or grasshopper mouse, full list): Baiomys (2 species); Habromys (6 species); Hodomys (1 species); Isthmomys (2 species); Megadontomys (3 species); Nelsonia (2 species); Neotoma (20 species); Neotomodon (1 species); Ochrotomys (1 species); Onychomys (3 species); Osgoodomys (1 species); Peromyscus (57 species); Podomys (1 species); Reithrodontomys (21 species); Scotinomys (2 species); Xenomys (1 species); Subfamily Sigmodontinae (New World rat or mouse, full list): Abrawayaomys (1 species); Abrothrix (8 species); Aegialomys (2 species); Aepeomys (2 species); Akodon (39 species); Amphinectomys (1 species); Andalgalomys (2 species); Andinomys (1 species); Anotomys (1 species); Auliscomys (3 species); Bibimys (3 species); Blarinomys (1 species); Brucepattersonius (7 species); Calomys (13 species); Casiomys (6 species); Cerradomys (4 species); Chelemys (2 species); Chibchanomys (2 species); Chilomys (1 species); Chinchillula (1 species); Delomys (3 species); Deltamys (1 species); Drymoreomys (1 species); Eligmodontia (4 species); Eremoryzomys (1 species); Euneomys (4 species); Euryoryzomys (6 species); Galenomys (1 species); Geoxus (2 species); Graomys (4 species); Gyldenstolpia (1 species); Handleyomys (2 species); Holochilus (3 species); Hylaeamys (8 species); Ichthyomys (4 species); Irenomys (1 species); Juliomys (2 species); Juscelinomys (2 species); Kunsia (1 species); Lenoxus (1 species); Loxodontomys (2 species); Lundomys (1 species); Megalomys † (2 extinct species); Megaoryzomys † (1 extinct species); Melanomys (3 species); Microakodontomys (1 species); Microryzomys (2 species); Mindomys (1 species); Neacomys (8 species); Necromys (9 species); Nectomys (5 species); Neomicroxus (2 species); Neotomys (1 species); Nephelomys (7 species); Nesoryzomys (5 species); Neusticomys (6 species); Noronhomys † (1 extinct species); Notiomys (1 species); Oecomys (15 species); Oligoryzomys (20 species); Oreoryzomys (1 species); Oryzomys (6 species); Oxymycterus (17 species); Phaenomys (1 species); Phyllotis (16 species); Podoxymys (1 species); Pseudoryzomys (1 species); Punomys (2 species); Reithrodon (2 species); Rhagomys (2 species); Rheomys (4 species); Rhipidomys (22 species); Salinomys (1 species); Scapteromys (2 species); Scolomys (2 species); Sigmodon (14 species); Sigmodontomys (1 species); Sooretamys (1 species); Tanyuromys (1 species); Tapecomys (1 species); Thalpomys (2 species); Thaptomys (1 species); Thomasomys (42 species); Transandinomys (2 species); Wiedomys (2 species); Wilfredomys (1 species); Zygodontomys (2 species); Subfamily Tylomyinae (vesper or climbing rat): Nyctomys (1 species); Otonyctomys (1 species); Ototylomys (1 species); Tylomys (7 species)	North America, South America, Europe, Asia,and northeastern Africa	Size range: 5 cm (2 in) long, plus 3 cm (1 in) tail (northern pygmy mouse) to 32 cm (13 in) long, plus 7 cm (3 in) tail (European hamster) Habitats: Forest, shrubland, inland wetlands, desert, rocky areas, grassland, savanna, caves, intertidal marine, and coastal marine Diets: Plant material and invertebrates; some species predominantly fish and other small vertebrates
Dipodidae (jerboa)	G. Fischer, 1817 33 species in 13 genera (full list): Subfamily Allactaginae (jerboa): Allactaga (8 species); Allactodipus (1 species); Pygeretmus (3 species); Scarturus (4 species, Williams's jerboa pictured); Subfamily Cardiocraniinae (pygmy jerboa): Cardiocranius (1 species); Salpingotulus (1 species); Salpingotus (5 species); Subfamily Dipodinae (three-toed jerboa): Dipus (1 species); Eremodipus (1 species); Jaculus (3 species); Paradipus (1 species); Stylodipus (3 species); Subfamily Euchoreutinae (long-eared jerboa): Euchoreutes (1 species)	Asia, northern Africa, and eastern Europe	Size range: 4 cm (2 in) long, plus 7 cm (3 in) tail (Baluchistan pygmy jerboa) to 23 cm (9 in) long, plus 30 cm (12 in) tail (great jerboa) Habitats: Desert, coastal marine, shrubland, grassland, rocky areas, and forest Diets: Seeds, plants, and insects
Muridae (Old World rat or mouse)	Illiger, 1811 814 species (13 extinct) in 156 genera (full lists): Subfamily Deomyinae (spiny mouse or brush-furred rat, full list): Acomys (4 species); Deomys (1 species); Lophuromys (31 species); Uranomys (1 species; Subfamily Gerbillinae (gerbil, jird, or sand rat, full list): Ammodillus (1 species); Brachiones (1 species); Desmodilliscus (1 species); Desmodillus (1 species); Gerbilliscus (16 species); Gerbillus (49 species); Meriones (17 species); Microdillus (1 species); Pachyuromys (1 species); Psammomys (2 species); Rhombomys (1 species); Sekeetamys (1 species); Tatera (1 species); Taterillus (9 species); Subfamily Leimacomyinae (Togo mouse): Leimacomys (1 species); Subfamily Lophiomyinae (maned rat): Lophiomys (1 species); Subfamily Murinae (Old World rat or mouse, full list): Abditomys (1 species); Abeomelomys (1 species); Aethomys (9 species); Anisomys (1 species); Anonymomys (1 species); Apodemus (20 species); Apomys (19 species); Archboldomys (2 species); Arvicanthis (7 species); Baiyankamys (2 species); Bandicota (3 species); Batomys (6 species); Berylmys (5 species); Brassomys (1 species); Bullimus (3 species); Bunomys (7 species); Carpomys (2 species); Chiromyscus (1 species); Chiropodomys (6 species); Chiruromys (2 species); Chrotomys (5 species); Coccymys (3 species); Colomys (1 species); Conilurus (3 species (2 extinct)); Crateromys (4 species); Cremnomys (2 species); Crossomys (1 species); Crunomys (4 species); Dacnomys (1 species); Dasymys (9 species); Dephomys (2 species); Desmomys (2 species); Diomys (1 species); Diplothrix (1 species); Echiothrix (2 species); Eropeplus (1 species); Frateromys (1 species); Golunda (1 species); Gracilimus (1 species); Grammomys (11 species); Hadromys (2 species); Haeromys (3 species); Halmaheramys (2 species); Hapalomys (3 species); Heimyscus (1 species); Hybomys (6 species); Hydromys (4 species); Hylomyscus (16 species); Hyomys (2 species); Hyorhinomys (1 species); Kadarsanomys (1 species); Komodomys (1 species); Lamottemys (1 species); Leggadina (2 species); Lemniscomys (11 species); Lenomys (1 species); Lenothrix (1 species); Leopoldamys (7 species); Leporillus (2 species (1 extinct)); Leptomys (5 species); Limnomys (2 species); Lorentzimys (1 species); Macruromys (2 species); Madromys (1 species); Malacomys (3 species); Mallomys (4 species); Mammelomys (2 species); Margaretamys (4 species); Mastacomys (1 species); Mastomys (8 species); Maxomys (18 species); Melasmothrix (1 species); Melomys (22 species (1 extinct)); Mesembriomys (2 species); Micaelamys (2 species); Microhydromys (2 species); Micromys (1 species); Millardia (4 species); Mirzamys (2 species); Muriculus (1 species); Mus (39 species, house mouse pictured); Musseromys (4 species); Mylomys (2 species); Myomyscus (4 species); Nesokia (2 species); Nesoromys (1 species); Nilopegamys (1 species); Niviventer (17 species); Notomys (10 species (5 extinct)); Oenomys (2 species); Otomys (28 species); Palawanomys (1 species); Papagomys (1 species); Parahydromys (1 species); Paraleptomys (2 species); Paramelomys (9 species); Parotomys (2 species); Paucidentomys (1 species); Paulamys (1 species); Pelomys (5 species); Phloeomys (2 species); Pithecheir (2 species); Pithecheirops (1 species); Pogonomelomys (3 species); Pogonomys (5 species); Praomys (17 species); Protochromys (1 species); Pseudohydromys (12 species); Pseudomys (23 species (2 extinct)); Rattus (68 species (2 extinct)); Rhabdomys (4 species); Rhynchomys (4 species); Saxatilomys (1 species); Solomys (4 species); Sommeromys (1 species); Soricomys (4 species); Srilankamys (1 species); Stenocephalemys (4 species); Stochomys (1 species); Sundamys (3 species); Taeromys (8 species); Tarsomys (2 species); Tateomys (2 species); Thallomys (4 species); Thamnomys (4 species); Tokudaia (3 species); Tonkinomys (1 species); Tryphomys (1 species); Uromys (11 species); Vandeleuria (3 species); Vernaya (1 species); Waiomys (1 species); Xenuromys (1 species); Xeromys (1 species); Zelotomys (2 species); Zyzomys (5 species)	Worldwide except for Antarctica	Size range: 4 cm (2 in) long, plus 2 cm (1 in) tail (African pygmy mouse) to 47 cm (19 in) long, plus 37 cm (15 in) tail (alpine woolly rat) Habitats: Savanna, forest, shrubland, grassland, desert, inland wetlands, coastal marine, and rocky areas Diets: Plant material and invertebrates; some species predominantly fish and other small vertebrates
Nesomyidae (African or Malagasy rat or mouse)	Major, 1897 67 species in 21 genera (full list): Subfamily Cricetomyinae (hamster-rat or pouched rat): Beamys (2 species); Cricetomys (4 species); Saccostomus (2 species); Subfamily Delanymyinae (Delany's mouse): Delanymys (1 species); Subfamily Dendromurinae (climbing or fat mouse): Dendromus (14 species); Dendroprionomys (1 species); Malacothrix (1 species); Megadendromus (1 species); Prionomys (1 species); Steatomys (8 species); Subfamily Mystromyinae (white-tailed rat): Mystromys (1 species); Subfamily Nesomyinae (Malagasy rodent): Brachytarsomys (2 species); Brachyuromys (2 species); Eliurus (12 species); Gymnuromys (1 species); Hypogeomys (1 species); Macrotarsomys (3 species); Monticolomys (1 species); Nesomys (3 species, white-bellied nesomys pictured); Voalavo (2 species); Subfamily Petromyscinae (rock mouse): Petromyscus (4 species)	Sub-Saharan Africa	Size range: 4 cm (2 in) long, plus 5 cm (2 in) tail (Monard's African climbing mouse) to 41 cm (16 in) long, plus 45 cm (18 in) tail (southern giant pouched rat) Habitats: Shrubland, forest, savanna, desert, grassland, inland wetlands, and rocky areas Diets: Plant material and invertebrates
Platacanthomyidae (Oriental dormouse)	Alston, 1876 2 species in 2 genera: Platacanthomys (1 species); Typhlomys (1 species, Chinese pygmy dormouse pictured)	Southern and eastern Asia	Size range: 7 cm (3 in) long, plus 9 cm (4 in) tail (Chinese pygmy dormouse) to 14 cm (6 in) long, plus 11 cm (4 in) tail (Malabar spiny dormouse) Habitats: Forest Diets: Fruit, seeds, grain, and roots
Sminthidae (birch mouse)	Brandt, 1855 16 species in 1 genus (full list): Sicista (16 species, northern birch mouse pictured)	Asia and Europe	Size range: 4–8 cm (2–3 in) long, plus 6–12 cm (2–5 in) tail (multiple) Habitats: Inland wetlands, shrubland, forest, and grassland Diets: Seeds, berries, and insects
Spalacidae (mole-rat)	J. E. Gray, 1821 23 species in 7 genera (full list): Subfamily Myospalacinae (zokor): Eospalax (3 species); Myospalax (3 species); Subfamily Rhizomyinae (bamboo rat or mole-rat): Cannomys (1 species); Rhizomys (3 species); Tachyoryctes (2 species); Subfamily Spalacinae (blind mole-rat): Nannospalax (3 species, lesser blind mole-rat pictured); Spalax (8 species)	Eastern Europe, eastern Africa, and Asia	Size range: 13 cm (5 in) long, with no tail (Middle East blind mole-rat) to 48 cm (19 in) long, plus 20 cm (8 in) tail (large bamboo rat) Habitats: Shrubland, grassland, forest, savanna, and desert Diets: Roots, bulbs, tubers, acorns, stems, and grain
Zapodidae (jumping mouse)	Coues, 1875 5 species in 3 genera: Eozapus (1 species); Napaeozapus (1 species); Zapus (1 species, western jumping mouse pictured)	North America and China	Size range: 7 cm (3 in) long, plus 11 cm (4 in) tail (Chinese jumping mouse) to 11 cm (4 in) long, plus 16 cm (6 in) tail (Pacific jumping mouse) Habitats: Forest, shrubland, grassland, and inland wetlands Diets: Seeds, fungi, and insects, as well as nuts, berries, and fruit

Suborder Sciuromorpha – Brandt, 1855 – three families
Name	Authority and species	Range	Size and ecology
Aplodontiidae (mountain beaver)	Brandt, 1855 1 species in 1 genus: Aplodontia (1 species, mountain beaver pictured)	Western United States and southwestern Canada	Size: 23–43 cm (9–17 in) long, plus 2–6 cm (1–2 in) tail Habitats: Forest, shrubland, and inland wetlands Diet: Variety of plant material
Gliridae (dormouse)	Muirhead, 1819 29 species in 9 genera (full list): Subfamily Glirinae (Japanese or edible dormouse): Glirulus (1 species); Glis (1 species); Subfamily Graphiurinae (African dormouse): Graphiurus (15 species); Subfamily Leithiinae (dormouse): Chaetocauda (1 species); Dryomys (3 species, forest dormouse pictured); Eliomys (3 species); Muscardinus (1 species); Myomimus (3 species); Selevinia (1 species)	Europe, Africa, and Asia	Size range: 6 cm (2 in) long, plus 6 cm (2 in) tail (Setzer's mouse-tailed dormouse) to 19 cm (7 in) long, plus 18 cm (7 in) tail (European edible dormouse) Habitats: Grassland, inland wetlands, rocky areas, savanna, shrubland, forest, desert, and coastal marine Diets: Fruit, nuts, insects, eggs, and small vertebrates
Sciuridae (squirrel, chipmunk, or marmot)	G. Fischer, 1817 284 species in 60 genera (full list): Subfamily Callosciurinae (Asian squirrel): Callosciurus (15 species); Dremomys (6 species); Exilisciurus (3 species); Funambulus (6 species); Glyphotes (1 species); Hyosciurus (2 species); Lariscus (4 species); Menetes (1 species); Nannosciurus (1 species); Prosciurillus (7 species); Rhinosciurus (1 species); Rubrisciurus (1 species); Sundasciurus (15 species); Tamiops (4 species); Subfamily Ratufinae (giant squirrel): Ratufa (4 species); Subfamily Sciurillinae (Neotropical pygmy squirrel): Sciurillus (1 species); Subfamily Sciurinae (tree squirrel or flying squirrel): Aeretes (1 species); Aeromys (2 species); Belomys (1 species); Biswamoyopterus (2 species); Eoglaucomys (1 species); Eupetaurus (1 species); Glaucomys (2 species); Hylopetes (9 species); Iomys (2 species); Microsciurus (4 species); Petaurillus (3 species); Petaurista (10 species); Petinomys (8 species); Pteromys (2 species); Pteromyscus (1 species); Rheithrosciurus (1 species); Sciurus (29 species, red squirrel pictured); Syntheosciurus (1 species); Tamiasciurus (3 species); Trogopterus (1 species); Subfamily Xerinae (ground squirrel, chipmunk, or prairie dog): Ammospermophilus (4 species); Atlantoxerus (1 species); Callospermophilus (3 species); Cynomys (5 species); Epixerus (1 species); Eutamias (1 species); Funisciurus (10 species); Heliosciurus (6 species); Ictidomys (2 species); Marmota (14 species); Myosciurus (1 species); Neotamias (23 species); Notocitellus (2 species); Otospermophilus (2 species); Paraxerus (11 species); Poliocitellus (1 species); Protoxerus (2 species); Sciurotamias (2 species); Spermophilopsis (1 species); Spermophilus (15 species); Tamias (1 species); Urocitellus (12 species); Xerospermophilus (4 species); Xerus (4 species)	Europe, Africa, Asia, North America, and South America	Size range: 6 cm (2 in) long, plus 6 cm (2 in) tail (lesser pygmy flying squirrel) to 75 cm (30 in) long, plus 24 cm (9 in) tail (Olympic marmot) Habitats: Forest, shrubland, grassland, inland wetlands, savanna, desert, rocky areas, and coastal marine Diets: Nuts, seeds, and other plant material; some species predominately insects

==== Superorder Laurasiatheria ====
===== Artiodactyla =====
Members of the Artiodactyla order are called artiodactyls or even-toed ungulates, and include deer, cattle, pigs, camels, whales, and dolphins. They are found worldwide on land and in oceans, and eat a wide variety of plant material, fish, and other marine animals. Artiodactyla comprises 24 families of 349 extant species in 133 genera. These families are grouped into four suborders: Ruminantia, containing deer, cattle, goats, a giraffes; Suina, containing pigs and peccaries; Tylopoda, containing camels and llamas; and Whippomorpha, containing whales, dolphins, and hippopotomuses. Three additional species have been driven to extinction in modern times.

Suborder Ruminantia – Scopoli, 1877 – six families
Name	Authority and species	Range	Size and ecology
Antilocapridae (pronghorn)	J. E. Gray, 1866 1 species in 1 genus: Antilocapra (1 species, pronghorn pictured)	Western North America (former range in yellow)	Size: 130–140 cm (51–55 in) long, plus 9–11 cm (4–4 in) tail Habitats: Shrubland, grassland, and desert Diet: Shrubs, forbs, grass, cacti, and other plants
Bovidae (cattle, antelope, or goat)	J. E. Gray, 1821 148 species (2 extinct) in 53 genera (full list): Subfamily Aepycerotinae (impala): Aepyceros (1 species); Subfamily Alcelaphinae (wildebeest): Alcelaphus (1 species); Beatragus (1 species); Connochaetes (2 species); Damaliscus (2 species); Subfamily Antilopinae (true antelope): Ammodorcas (1 species); Antidorcas (1 species); Antilope (1 species); Dorcatragus (1 species); Eudorcas (5 species); Gazella (10 species); Litocranius (1 species); Madoqua (4 species); Nanger (3 species); Neotragus (3 species); Ourebia (1 species); Procapra (3 species); Raphicerus (3 species); Saiga (1 species); Subfamily Bovinae (cattle): Bison (2 species); Bos (10 species (1 extinct), cattle pictured); Boselaphus (1 species); Bubalus (5 species); Pseudoryx (1 species); Syncerus (1 species); Taurotragus (2 species); Tetracerus (1 species); Tragelaphus (7 species); Subfamily Caprinae (impala): Ammotragus (1 species); Arabitragus (1 species); Budorcas (1 species); Capra (9 species); Capricornis (4 species); Hemitragus (1 species); Naemorhedus (4 species); Nilgiritragus (1 species); Oreamnos (1 species); Ovibos (1 species); Ovis (7 species); Pantholops (1 species); Pseudois (1 species); Rupicapra (2 species); Subfamily Cephalophinae (duiker): Cephalophus (15 species); Philantomba (3 species); Sylvicapra (1 species); Subfamily Hippotraginae (addax): Addax (1 species); Hippotragus (3 species (1 extinct)); Oryx (4 species); Subfamily Nesotraginae (dwarf antelope): Nesotragus (2 species); Subfamily Oreotraginae (klipspringer): Oreotragus (1 species); Subfamily Reduncinae (reedbuck): Kobus (5 species); Pelea (1 species); Redunca (3 species)	Africa, Asia, Europe, and North America	Size range: 38 cm (15 in) long, plus 5 cm (2 in) tail (royal antelope) to 380 cm (150 in) long, plus 100 cm (39 in) tail (wild yak) Habitats: Forest, savanna, shrubland, grassland, desert, inland wetlands, and rocky areas, and coastal marine Diets: Grass, stems, and leaves
Cervidae (deer)	Goldfuss, 1820 56 species (1 extinct) in 19 genera (full list): Subfamily Capreolinae (New World deer): Alces (1 species); Blastocerus (1 species); Capreolus (2 species); Hippocamelus (2 species); Hydropotes (1 species); Mazama (9 species); Odocoileus (3 species, white-tailed deer pictured); Ozotoceros (1 species); Pudu (2 species); Rangifer (1 species); Subfamily Cervinae (Old World deer): Axis (4 species); Cervus (5 species); Dama (2 species); Elaphodus (1 species); Elaphurus (1 species); Muntiacus (12 species); Panolia (1 species); Rucervus (2 species (1 extinct)); Rusa (4 species)	North and South America, Europe, and Asia	Size range: 70 cm (28 in) long, with no tail (dwarf brocket) to 300 cm (118 in) long, plus 16 cm (6 in) tail (moose) Habitats: Forest, shrubland, savanna, grassland, rocky areas, inland wetlands, neritic marine, intertidal marine, and intertidal marine Diets: Grass, bark, twigs, and shoots
Giraffidae (giraffe or okapi)	J. E. Gray, 1821 5 species in 2 genera: Giraffa (4 species, Masai giraffe pictured); Okapia (1 species)	Scattered Sub-Saharan Africa	Size range: 200 cm (79 in) long, plus 30 cm (12 in) tail (okapi) to 470 cm (185 in) long, plus 100 cm (39 in) tail (Masai giraffe) Habitats: Forest, shrubland, savanna, grassland, and rocky areas Diets: Leaves, as well as other vegetation and fruit
Moschidae (musk deer)	J. E. Gray, 1821 7 species in 1 genus: Moschus (7 species, Siberian musk deer pictured)	Asia	Size range: 65 cm (26 in) long, plus 4 cm (2 in) tail (Siberian musk deer) to 100 cm (39 in) long, plus 6 cm (2 in) tail (white-bellied musk deer) Habitats: Forest, shrubland, grassland, and rocky areas Diets: Grass, moss, shoots, twigs, buds, and lichen
Tragulidae (chevrotain)	H. Milne-Edwards, 1864 10 species in 3 genera: Hyemoschus (1 species); Moschiola (3 species); Tragulus (6 species, lesser mouse-deer pictured)	Central and western Africa and southern and southeastern Asia	Size range: 35 cm (14 in) long, plus 6 cm (2 in) tail (lesser mouse-deer) to 102 cm (40 in) long, plus 11 cm (4 in) tail (water chevrotain) Habitats: Forest, savanna, shrubland, grassland, inland wetlands, and marine Diets: Fruit, leaves, buds, and grass

Suborder Suina – J. E. Gray, 1868 – two families
Name	Authority and species	Range	Size and ecology
Suidae (pig)	J. E. Gray, 1821 17 species in 6 genera: Babyrousa (3 species); Hylochoerus (1 species); Phacochoerus (2 species); Porcula (1 species); Potamochoerus (2 species); Tragulus (8 species, wild boar pictured)	Asia, Europe, and Africa; introduced worldwide	Size range: 55 cm (22 in) long, plus 3 cm (1 in) tail (pygmy hog) to 210 cm (83 in) long, plus 45 cm (18 in) tail (giant forest hog) Habitats: Forest, savanna, shrubland, grassland, inland wetlands, desert, neritic marine, intertidal marine Diets: Omnivorous, including fungi, leaves, roots, bulbs, tubers, fruit, snails, worms, reptiles, birds, eggs, rodents, and carrion
Tayassuidae (peccary)	Palmer, 1897 3 species in 3 genera: Catagonus (1 species); Dicotyles (1 species, collared peccary pictured); Tayassu (1 species)	North and South America	Size range: 84 cm (33 in) long, plus 1 cm (0.4 in) tail (collared peccary) to 139 cm (55 in) long, plus 7 cm (3 in) tail (white-lipped peccary) Habitats: Forest, savanna, shrubland, grassland, and desert Diets: Fruit, seeds, and roots, as well as invertebrates, small vertebrates, and carrion

Suborder Tylopoda – Illiger, 1811 – one family
Name	Authority and species	Range	Size and ecology
Camelidae (camel)	J. E. Gray, 1821 7 species in 2 genera: Camelus (3 species, dromedary pictured); Lama (4 species)	South America, Africa, Asia, and Australia	Size range: 124 cm (49 in) long, plus 15 cm (6 in) tail (vicuña) to 350 cm (138 in) long, plus 64 cm (25 in) tail (wild Bactrian camel) Habitats: Shrubland, grassland, inland wetlands, and desert Diets: Grass, as well as other vegetation

Suborder Whippomorpha – Waddell, Okada, & Hasegawa, 1999 – fifteen families
Name	Authority and species	Range	Size and ecology
Balaenidae (right whale)	J. E. Gray, 1821 4 species in 2 genera: Balaena (1 species, bowhead whale pictured); Eubalaena (3 species)	Temperate and polar Pacific and Atlantic Oceans	Size range: 13.4–20.0 m (44–66 ft) long (multiple) Habitats: Neritic marine and oceanic marine Diets: Krill, as well as other crustaceans and mollusks
Balaenopteridae (rorqual)	J. E. Gray, 1864 10 species in 2 genera: Balaenoptera (9 species, fin whale pictured); Megaptera (1 species)	Worldwide oceans	Size range: 6.5 m (21 ft) long (common minke whale) to 32.6 m (107 ft) long (blue whale) Habitats: Neritic marine and oceanic marine Diets: Krill and other crustaceans, as well as fish
Cetotheriidae (pygmy right whale)	Brandt, 1872 1 species in 1 genus: Caperea (1 species, pygmy right whale pictured)	Sub-Antarctic oceans	Size: 5.9–6.5 m (19–21 ft) long Habitats: Neritic marine and oceanic marine Diet: Crustaceans
Delphinidae (oceanic dolphin)	J. E. Gray, 1821 37 species in 19 genera: Subfamily Delphininae (dolphin): Delphinus (1 species); Lagenodelphis (1 species); Sotalia (2 species); Sousa (4 species); Stenella (5 species); Tursiops (2 species, common bottlenose dolphin pictured); Subfamily Lissodelphininae (smooth dolphin): Cephalorhynchus (4 species); Lissodelphis (2 species); Subfamily Globicephalinae (round-headed whale): Feresa (1 species); Globicephala (2 species); Grampus (1 species); Orcaella (2 species); Peponocephala (1 species); Pseudorca (1 species); Steno (1 species); Subfamily Orcininae (killer whale): Orcinus (1 species); No subfamily: Lagenorhynchus (6 species)	Worldwide oceans and seas, and rivers in South America and southern and southeastern Asia	Size range: 1.2 m (4 ft) long (spinner dolphin) to 9.8 m (32 ft) long (orca) Habitats: Neritic marine, oceanic marine, coastal marine, intertidal marine, and inland wetlands Diets: Fish, cephalopods, shrimp, and crustaceans
Eschrichtiidae (gray whale)	Ellerman & Morrison-Scott, 1951 1 species in 1 genus: Eschrichtius (1 species, gray whale pictured)	Northern Pacific Ocean	Size: 13.0–14.2 m (43–47 ft) long Habitats: Neritic marine and oceanic marine Diet: Small crustaceans, as well as fish, molluscs, and other crustaceans
Hippopotamidae (hippopotamus)	J. E. Gray, 1821 2 species in 2 genera: Choeropsis (1 species); Hippopotamus (1 species, hippopotamus pictured)	Scattered Sub-Saharan Africa	Size range: 1.5 m (5 ft) long (pygmy hippopotamus) to 5.1 m (17 ft) long (hippopotamus) Habitats: Forest, savanna, shrubland, grassland, inland wetlands, neritic marine, coastal marine Diets: Grass, water plants, shoots, leaves, and fruit
Iniidae (South American river dolphin)	J. E. Gray, 1846 4 species in 1 genus: Inia (4 species, Amazon river dolphin pictured)	South American rivers	Size range: 1.7 m (6 ft) long (Amazon river dolphin) to 2.6 m (9 ft) long (Araguaian river dolphin) Habitats: Inland wetlands Diets: Fish
Kogiidae (pygmy sperm whale)	Gill, 1871 2 species in 1 genus: Kogia (2 species, dwarf sperm whale pictured)	Worldwide tropical and temperate oceans	Size range: 2.0 m (7 ft) long (dwarf sperm whale) to 4.2 m (14 ft) long (pygmy sperm whale) Habitats: Oceanic marine Diets: Cephalopods, fish, and crustaceans
Lipotidae (baiji)	Zhou, Qian, & Li, 1978 1 species in 1 genus: Lipotes (1 species, baiji pictured)	Yangtze river in China	Size: 1.8–2.6 m (6–9 ft) long Habitats: Inland wetlands Diet: Fish
Monodontidae (narwhal or beluga whale)	J. E. Gray, 1821 2 species in 2 genera: Delphinapterus (1 species); Monodon (1 species, narwhal pictured)	Arctic and subarctic oceans	Size range: 3.0 m (10 ft) long (beluga) to 5.0 m (16 ft) long (narwhal) Habitats: Neritic marine and oceanic marine Diets: Fish, cephalopods, and crustaceans
Phocoenidae (porpoise)	J. E. Gray, 1825 8 species in 3 genera: Neophocaena (3 species, East Asian finless porpoise pictured); Phocoena (4 species); Phocoenoides (1 species)	North Atlantic, North Pacific, and Antarctic oceans, Black Sea, and South American and Asian coasts	Size range: 1.2 m (4 ft) long (vaquita) to 2.4 m (8 ft) long (Dall's porpoise) Habitats: Inland wetlands, neritic marine, oceanic marine, intertidal marine, and coastal marine Diets: Squid and fish
Physeteridae (sperm whale)	Rafinesque, 1815 1 species in 1 genus: Physeter (1 species, sperm whale pictured)	Worldwide oceans (concentrations in black)	Size: 10.4–19.2 m (34–63 ft) long Habitats: Neritic marine and oceanic marine Diet: Squid, as well as sharks and fish
Platanistidae (South Asian river dolphin)	J. E. Gray, 1846 2 species in 1 genus: Platanista (2 species, Ganges river dolphin pictured)	Rivers of the Ganges Basin (orange) and the Indus Basin (blue)	Size range: 2.0 m (7 ft) long (Indus river dolphin) to 4.0 m (13 ft) long (Ganges river dolphin) Habitats: Neritic marine and inland wetlands Diets: Fish and shrimp
Pontoporiidae (La Plata dolphin)	J. E. Gray, 1870 1 species in 1 genus: Pontoporia (1 species, La Plata dolphin pictured)	Southeastern South American coast	Size: 1.1–1.7 m (4–6 ft) long Habitats: Neritic marine and oceanic marine Diet: Fish, squid, and shrimp
Ziphiidae (beaked whale)	J. E. Gray, 1865 23 species in 6 genera: Subfamily Berardiinae (four-toothed whale): Berardius (3 species, Arnoux's beaked whale pictured); Subfamily Hyperoodontinae (bottlenose whale): Hyperoodon (2 species); Indopacetus (1 species); Mesoplodon (15 species); Subfamily Ziphiinae (beaked whale): Tasmacetus (1 species); Ziphius (1 species)	Worldwide oceans	Size range: 3.7 m (12 ft) long (pygmy beaked whale) to 12.0 m (39 ft) long (Baird's beaked whale) Habitats: Oceanic marine Diets: Squid, as well as octopuses, crustaceans, and fish

===== Carnivora =====
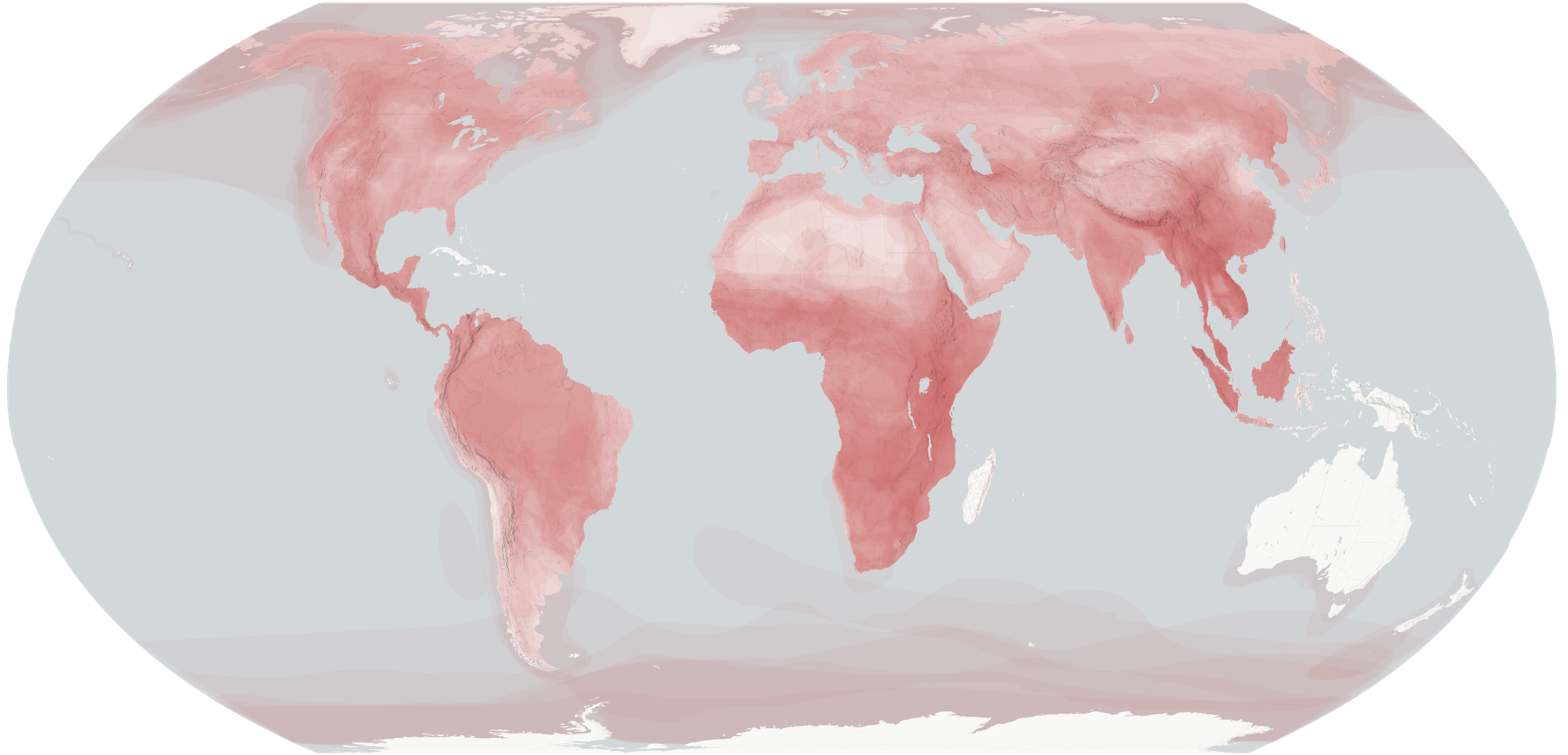
The extant distribution and density of Carnivora species, excluding introductions

Members of the Carnivora order are called carnivorans, and include dogs, bears, raccoons, weasels, seals, cats, hyenas, and mongooses. They are found worldwide on land and in oceans, and are omnivorous, with some species predominately eating plant material or aquatic animals. Carnivora comprises 16 families of 291 extant species in 131 genera. These families are grouped into two suborders: Caniformia, containing dogs, foxes, bears, raccoons, skunks, weasels, and seals, and Feliformia, containing cats, hyenas, mongooses, and civets. Six additional species have been driven to extinction in modern times.

Suborder Caniformia – Kretzoi, 1943 – nine families
Name	Authority and species	Range	Size and ecology
Ailuridae (red panda)	J. E. Gray, 1843 1 species in 1 genus: Ailurus (1 species, red panda pictured)	Eastern Himalayas and southwestern China	Size: 57–79 cm (22–31 in) long, plus 36–50 cm (14–20 in) tail Habitats: Forest and shrubland Diet: Bamboo sprouts, grass, roots, fruit, and nuts, as well as insects, eggs, and small vertebrates
Canidae (wolf or fox)	G. Fischer, 1817 39 species (2 extinct) in 15 genera (1 extinct) (full list): Atelocynus (1 species); Canis (6 species, grey wolf pictured); Cerdocyon (1 species); Chrysocyon (1 species); Cuon (1 species); Dusicyon † (2 extinct species); Lupulella (2 species); Lycaon (1 species); Lycalopex (6 species); Nyctereutes (2 species); Otocyon (1 species); Speothos (1 species); Urocyon (2 species); Vulpes (12 species)	Worldwide	Size range: 33 cm (13 in) long, plus 12 cm (5 in) tail (fennec fox) to 130 cm (51 in) long, plus 52 cm (20 in) tail (grey wolf) Habitats: Shrubland, grassland, inland wetlands, forest, desert, rocky areas, savanna, desert, and coastal marine Diets: Omnivorous, including a variety of vertebrates, crabs, insects, fruit, and carrion
Mephitidae (skunk or stink badger)	É. Geoffroy & Cuvier, 1795 12 species in 4 genera (full list): Conepatus (4 species); Mephitis (2 species, striped skunk pictured); Mydaus (2 species); Spilogale (4 species)	North America, South America, Southeast Asia	Size range: 17 cm (7 in) long, plus 15 cm (6 in) tail (striped skunk) to 52 cm (20 in) long, plus 8 cm (3 in) tail (Sunda stink badger) Habitats: Desert, shrubland, rocky areas, grassland, savanna, forest, inland wetlands, and coastal marine Diets: Omnivorous, particularly insects and fruit
Mustelidae (marten, polecat, otter, or badger)	É. Geoffroy & Cuvier, 1795 63 species in 23 genera (full list): Subfamily Guloninae (marten or wolverine): Eira (1 species); Gulo (1 species); Martes (7 species); Pekania (1 species); Subfamily Helictidinae (ferret-badger) : Melogale (5 species); Subfamily Ictonychinae (African polecat or grison): Galictis (2 species); Ictonyx (2 species); Lyncodon (1 species); Poecilogale (1 species); Vormela (1 species); Subfamily Lutrinae (otter): Aonyx (3 species); Enhydra (1 species); Hydrictis (1 species); Lontra (4 species); Lutra (3 species, Eurasian otter pictured); Lutrogale (1 species); Pteronura (1 species); Subfamily Melinae (Eurasian badger): Arctonyx (3 species); Meles (3 species); Subfamily Mellivorinae (honey badger): Mellivora (1 species); Subfamily Mustelinae (weasel or mink): Mustela (15 species); Neogale (5 species); Subfamily Taxidiinae (American badger): Taxidea (1 species)	All continents except Antarctica and Australia	Size range: 11 cm (4 in) long, plus 7 cm (3 in) tail (least weasel) to 130 cm (51 in) long, plus 65 cm (26 in) tail (giant otter) Habitats: Forest, grassland, rocky areas, shrubland, savanna, inland wetlands, desert, neritic marine, oceanic marine, coastal marine, and intertidal marine Diets: Omnivorous; some species predominately plant material or aquatic animals
Odobenidae (walrus)	Allen, 1880 1 species in 1 genus (full list): Odobenus (1 species, walrus pictured)	Arctic Ocean and subarctic seas	Size: 260–315 cm (102–124 in) long Habitats: Neritic marine, oceanic marine, intertidal marine, and coastal marine Diet: Bivalve molluscs, as well as other invertebrates, fish, and seals
Otariidae (eared seal)	J. E. Gray, 1825 16 species in 7 genera (full list): Arctocephalus (8 species); Callorhinus (1 species); Eumetopias (1 species); Neophoca (1 species); Otaria (1 species); Phocarctos (1 species); Zalophus (3 species, California sea lion pictured)	Antarctic Ocean, southern seas, and coasts of South America, Australia, Pacific Asia and Pacific North America	Size range: 110 cm (43 in) long (Galápagos fur seal) to 330 cm (130 in) long (Steller sea lion) Habitats: Forest, shrubland, inland wetlands, neritic marine, oceanic marine, intertidal marine, and coastal marine Diets: Fish, as well as cephalopods and crustaceans
Phocidae (earless seal)	J. E. Gray, 1821 19 species in 14 genera (full list): Cystophora (1 species); Erignathus (1 species); Halichoerus (1 species); Histriophoca (1 species); Hydrurga (1 species); Leptonychotes (1 species); Lobodon (1 species); Mirounga (2 species); Monachus (1 species); Neomonachus (2 species); Ommatophoca (1 species); Pagophilus (1 species); Phoca (2 species, harbor seal pictured); Pusa (3 species)	Antarctic Ocean, Arctic Ocean, Northern Hemisphere coastlines, Caspian Sea, and Lake Baikal	Size range: 150 cm (59 in) long (ribbon seal) to 500 cm (197 in) long (southern elephant seal) Habitats: Neritic marine, oceanic marine, intertidal marine, coastal marine, and inland wetlands Diets: Fish, shellfish, and cephalopods, as well as penguins and seals
Procyonidae (raccoon or ring-tailed cat)	J. E. Gray, 1825 14 species in 6 genera (full list): Bassaricyon (4 species); Bassariscus (2 species); Nasua (2 species); Nasuella (2 species); Potos (1 species); Procyon (3 species, raccoon pictured)	North and South America (common raccoon introduced to Europe, western Asia, and Japan)	Size range: 30 cm (12 in) long, plus 31 cm (12 in) tail (ringtail) to 76 cm (30 in) long, plus 57 cm (22 in) tail (kinkajou) Habitats: Shrubland, forest, rocky areas, desert, grassland, and inland wetlands Diets: Omnivorous; some species predominately bamboo or fruit
Ursidae (bear)	G. Fischer, 1817 8 species in 5 genera (full list): Subfamily Ailuropodinae (panda): Ailuropoda (1 species); Subfamily Tremarctinae (short-faced bear): Tremarctos (1 species); Subfamily Ursinae (bear): Helarctos (1 species); Melursus (1 species); Ursus (4 species, brown bear pictured)	North and South America, Europe, Asia, and northern Africa	Size range: 100 cm (39 in) long, plus 3 cm (1 in) tail (sun bear) to 280 cm (110 in) long, plus 21 cm (8 in) tail (brown bear) Habitats: Shrubland, grassland, forest, savanna, inland wetlands, desert, oceanic marine, coastal marine, and intertidal marine Diets: Omnivorous; some species predominately bamboo or fish and seals

Suborder Feliformia – Kretzoi, 1945 – seven families
Name	Authority and species	Range	Size and ecology
Eupleridae (Malagasy carnivoran)	Chenu, 1850 10 species in 7 genera: Subfamily Euplerinae (malagasy civet): Cryptoprocta (1 species, fossa pictured); Eupleres (2 species); Fossa (1 species); Subfamily Galidiinae (vontsira): Galidia (1 species); Galidictis (2 species); Mungotictis (1 species); Salanoia (2 species)	Madagascar	Size range: 26 cm (10 in) long, plus 19 cm (7 in) tail (narrow-striped mongoose) to 80 cm (31 in) long, plus 70 cm (28 in) tail (fossa) Habitats: Forest, shrubland, and inland wetlands Diets: Small mammals, birds, eggs, worms, insects, and fruit, as well as reptiles, frogs, and other invertebrates
Felidae (cat)	G. Fischer, 1817 41 species in 14 genera (full list): Subfamily Felinae (small or medium-sized cat): Acinonyx (1 species); Caracal (2 species); Catopuma (2 species); Felis (7 species); Herpailurus (1 species); Leopardus (8 species); Leptailurus (1 species); Lynx (4 species); Otocolobus (1 species); Pardofelis (1 species); Prionailurus (5 species); Puma (1 species); Subfamily Pantherinae (large cat): Neofelis (2 species); Panthera (5 species, tiger pictured)	Worldwide (Felinae (excluding the domestic cat) in blue, Pantherinae in green	Size range: 35 cm (14 in) long, plus 15 cm (6 in) tail (rusty-spotted cat) to 290 cm (114 in) long, plus 109 cm (43 in) tail (tiger) Habitats: Forest, desert, shrubland, savanna, grassland, rocky areas, and inland wetlands Diets: Mammals and birds, as well as fish and reptiles
Herpestidae (mongoose)	Bonaparte, 1845 34 species in 14 genera (full list): Subfamily Herpestinae (mongoose): Atilax (1 species); Bdeogale (3 species); Cynictis (1 species); Herpestes (5 species); Ichneumia (1 species); Paracynictis (1 species); Rhynchogale (1 species); Urva (9 species); Xenogale (1 species); Subfamily Mungotinae (African mongoose): Crossarchus (4 species); Dologale (1 species); Helogale (2 species); Liberiictis (1 species); Mungos (2 species); Suricata (1 species, meerkat pictured)	Southern Europe, Africa, and Asia	Size range: 16 cm (6 in) long, plus 14 cm (6 in) tail (common dwarf mongoose) to 69 cm (27 in) long, plus 48 cm (19 in) tail (white-tailed mongoose) Habitats: Shrubland, forest, rocky areas, inland wetlands, savanna, grassland, desert, neritic marine, and coastal marine Diets: Small vertebrates, invertebrates, eggs, fruit, crabs, and fish, as well as other vegetation
Hyaenidae (hyena)	J. E. Gray, 1821 4 species in 4 genera: Crocuta (1 species, spotted hyena pictured); Hyaena (1 species); Parahyaena (1 species); Proteles (1 species)	Africa and southern Asia	Size range: 55 cm (22 in) long, plus 20 cm (8 in) tail (aardwolf) to 160 cm (63 in) long, plus 27 cm (11 in) tail (spotted hyena) Habitats: Forest, savanna, shrubland, grassland, inland wetlands, rocky areas, desert, intertidal marine, and coastal marine Diets: Variety of mammals, carrion, and insects
Nandiniidae (African palm civet)	Pocock, 1929 1 species in 1 genus: Nandinia (1 species, African palm civet pictured)	Sub-Saharan Africa	Size: 37–62 cm (15–24 in) long, plus 34–76 cm (13–30 in) tail Habitats: Forest, savanna, and shrubland Diet: Fruit, as well as rodents, eggs, and insects
Prionodontidae (Asiatic linsang)	J. E. Gray, 1864 2 species in 1 genus: Prionodon (2 species, banded linsang pictured)	Southeastern Asia	Size range: 31 cm (12 in) long, plus 30 cm (12 in) tail (spotted linsang) to 38 cm (15 in) long, plus 33 cm (13 in) tail (banded linsang) Habitats: Forest, shrubland, and grassland Diets: Small mammals, birds, eggs, and insects
Viverridae (civet or genet)	J. E. Gray, 1821 33 species in 14 genera (full list): Subfamily Genettinae (genet): Genetta (14 species); Poiana (2 species); Subfamily Hemigalinae (civet): Chrotogale (1 species); Cynogale (1 species); Diplogale (1 species); Hemigalus (1 species); Subfamily Paradoxurinae (civet): Arctictis (1 species); Arctogalidia (1 species); Macrogalidia (1 species); Paguma (1 species); Paradoxurus (3 species); Subfamily Viverrinae (civet): Civettictis (1 species); Viverra (4 species, Malayan civet pictured); Viverricula (1 species)	Africa and southern and southeastern Asia	Size range: 30 cm (12 in) long, plus 35 cm (14 in) tail (West African oyan) to 96 cm (38 in) long, plus 84 cm (33 in) tail (binturong) Habitats: Forest, savanna, shrubland, grassland, inland wetlands, and rocky areas Diets: Small vertebrates and invertebrates, as well as fruit, bulbs, and nuts

===== Chiroptera =====
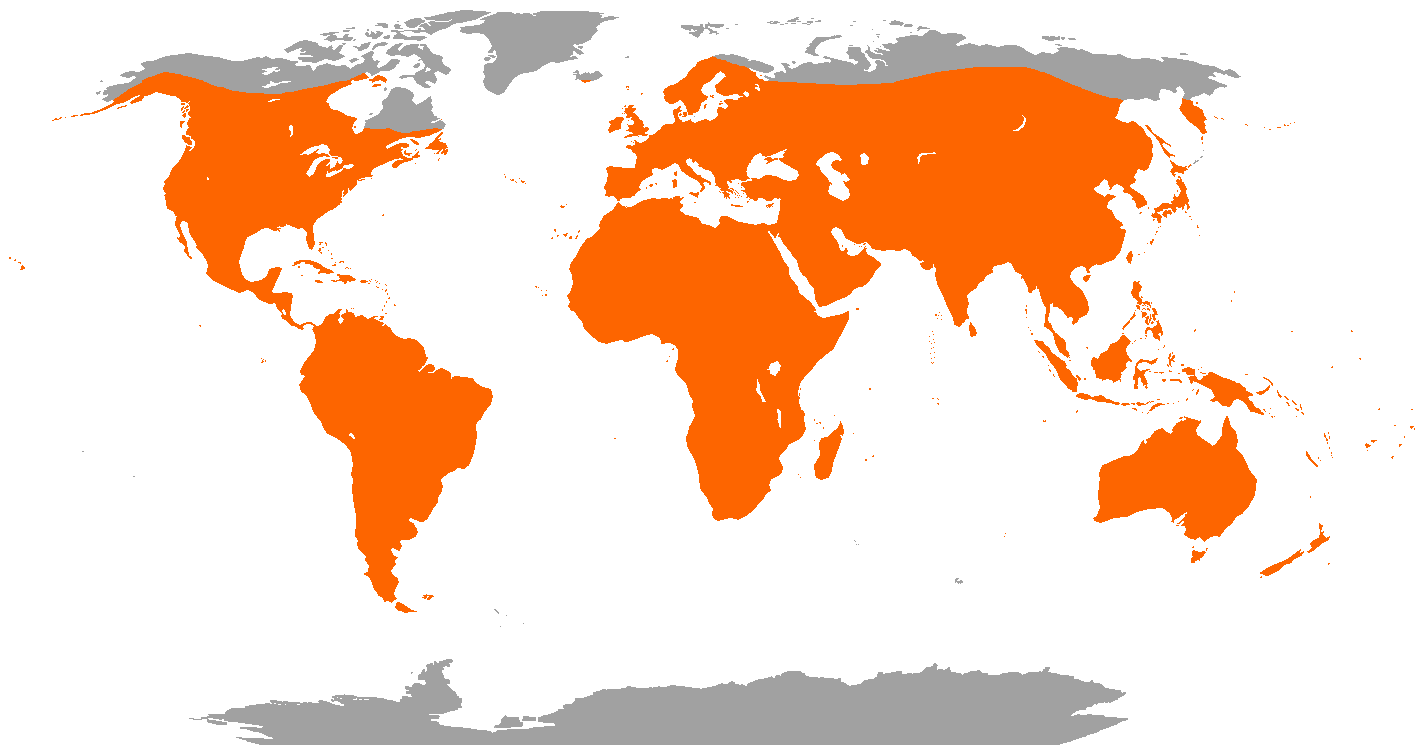
Chiroptera distribution

Members of the Chiroptera order are called chiropterans or bats. They are found worldwide, and predominately eat insects, with some species also eating fruit or fish. Chiroptera comprises 21 families of 1,513 extant species—about 20% of all mammal species—in 237 genera. These families are grouped into two suborders: Yangochiroptera, containing sheath-tailed, leaf-nosed, free-tailed, and vesper bats, and Yinpterochiroptera, containing Old World leaf-nosed, fruit, and horseshoe bats. Nine additional species have been driven to extinction in modern times.

Suborder Yangochiroptera – Koopman, 1984 – fourteen families
Name	Authority and species	Range	Size and ecology
Cistugidae (wing-gland bat)	Lack, Roehrs, Stanley Jr., Ruedi, & Van Den Bussche, 2010 2 species in 1 genus: Cistugo (2 species, Lesueur's hairy bat pictured)	Southern Africa	Size range: 4 cm (2 in) long, plus 3 cm (1 in) (Angolan hairy bat) to 6 cm (2 in) long, plus 4 cm (2 in) tail (Lesueur's hairy bat) Habitats: Rocky areas, shrubland, grassland, and desert Diets: Insects
Emballonuridae (sheath-tailed bat)	Gervais, 1855 55 species in 14 genera (full list): Subfamily Emballonurinae (sheath-tailed, sac-winged, or ghost bat): Balantiopteryx (3 species); Centronycteris (2 species); Coleura (4 species); Cormura (1 species); Cyttarops (1 species); Diclidurus (4 species); Emballonura (8 species); Mosia (1 species); Paremballonura (2 species); Peropteryx (5 species, lesser dog-like bat pictured); Rhynchonycteris (1 species); Saccopteryx (5 species); Subfamily Taphozoinae (pouched or tomb bat): Saccolaimus (4 species); Taphozous (14 species)	Mexico, Central America, South America, Africa, Australia, and Asia	Size range: 3 cm (1 in) long, plus 1 cm (0.4 in) tail (Amazonian sac-winged bat) to 14 cm (6 in) long, plus 4 cm (2 in) tail (Pel's pouched bat) Habitats: Shrubland, forest, caves, savanna, inland wetlands, and desert Diets: Insects, as well as fruit
Furipteridae (smoky or thumbless bat)	J. E. Gray, 1866 2 species in 2 genera: Amorphochilus (1 species); Furipterus (1 species, thumbless bat pictured)	Central America and South America	Size range: 3 cm (1 in) long, plus 2 cm (1 in) (thumbless bat) to 5 cm (2 in) long, plus 4 cm (2 in) tail (smoky bat) Habitats: Forest and caves Diets: Insects
Miniopteridae (bent-winged or long-fingered bat)	Dobson, 1875 31 species in 1 genus (full list): Miniopterus (41 species, common bent-wing bat pictured)	Europe, Africa, and western, southeastern, and eastern Asia	Size range: 3 cm (1 in) long, plus 3 cm (1 in) tail (Shortridge's long-fingered bat) to 8 cm (3 in) long, plus 7 cm (3 in) tail (great bent-winged bat) Habitats: Shrubland, forest, grassland, rocky areas, caves, savanna, inland wetlands, and desert Diets: Insects
Molossidae (free-tailed bat)	Gervais, 1855 133 species in 22 genera (full list): Subfamily Molossinae (free-tailed bat): Austronomus (2 species); Cabreramops (1 species); Cheiromeles (2 species); Cynomops (9 species); Eumops (17 species); Micronomus (1 species); Molossops (4 species); Molossus (16 species, velvety free-tailed bat pictured); Mops (36 species); Mormopterus (7 species); Myopterus (2 species); Neoplatymops (1 species); Nyctinomops (4 species); Nyctinomus (1 species); Otomops (8 species); Ozimops (9 species); Platymops (1 species); Promops (3 species); Sauromys (1 species); Setirostris (1 species); Tadarida (7 species); Subfamily Tomopeatinae (blunt-eared bat): Tomopeas (1 species)	Worldwide except Antarctica	Size range: 3 cm (1 in) long, plus 2 cm (1 in) tail (blunt-eared bat) to 18 cm (7 in) long, plus 8 cm (3 in) tail (hairless bat) Habitats: Forest, coastal marine, rocky areas, savanna, shrubland, grassland, caves, inland wetlands, and desert Diets: Insects
Mormoopidae (ghost-faced or mustached bat)	Saussure, 1860 18 species in 2 genera (full list): Mormoops (2 species); Pteronotus (16 species, Wagner's mustached bat pictured)	Southern North America, Central America, and northern and central South America	Size range: 4 cm (2 in) long, plus 1 cm (0.4 in) tail (sooty mustached bat) to 8 cm (3 in) long, plus 4 cm (2 in) tail (ghost-faced bat) Habitats: Savanna, caves, and forest Diets: Insects
Mystacinidae (New Zealand short-tailed bat)	Dobson, 1875 2 species in 1 genus: Mystacina (2 species, New Zealand lesser short-tailed bat pictured)	New Zealand	Size range: 6 cm (2 in) long, plus 0.5 cm (0.2 in) (New Zealand lesser short-tailed bat) to 9 cm (4 in) long, plus 2 cm (1 in) tail (New Zealand greater short-tailed bat) Habitats: Forest Diets: Invertebrates, fruit, nectar, and pollen
Myzopodidae (sucker-footed bat)	H. Milne-Edwards & A. Grandidier, 1878 2 species in 1 genus: Myzopoda (2 species, Madagascar sucker-footed bat pictured)	Madagascar	Size range: 4 cm (2 in) long, plus 4 cm (2 in) (western sucker-footed bat) to 7 cm (3 in) long, plus 6 cm (2 in) tail (Madagascar sucker-footed bat) Habitats: Forest, inland wetlands, and caves Diets: Insects
Natalidae (funnel-eared bat)	J. E. Gray, 1866 11 species in 3 genera (full list): Chilonatalus (3 species); Natalus (7 species, Mexican greater funnel-eared bat pictured); Nyctiellus (1 species)	Central America, South America, and Caribbean	Size range: 3 cm (1 in) long, plus 4 cm (2 in) tail (Mexican greater funnel-eared bat) to 6 cm (2 in) long, plus 6 cm (2 in) tail (Jamaican greater funnel-eared bat) Habitats: Caves and forest Diets: Insects
Noctilionidae (bulldog bat)	J. E. Gray, 1821 2 species in 1 genus: Noctilio (2 species, lesser bulldog bat pictured)	Mexico, Caribbean, Central America, and South America	Size range: 6 cm (2 in) long, plus 1 cm (0.4 in) (lesser bulldog bat) to 10 cm (4 in) long, plus 3 cm (1 in) tail (greater bulldog bat) Habitats: Forest, savanna, shrubland, and caves Diets: Insects, other invertebrates, and fish
Nycteridae (slit-faced bat)	Hoeven, 1855 14 species in 1 genus (full list): Nycteris (14 species, hairy slit-faced bat pictured)	Africa, western Arabian Peninsula, and southeastern Asia	Size range: 3 cm (1 in) long, plus 3 cm (1 in) tail (dwarf slit-faced bat) to 9 cm (4 in) long, plus 9 cm (4 in) tail (large slit-faced bat) Habitats: Shrubland, forest, grassland, rocky areas, savanna, caves, and desert Diets: Insects and other invertebrates, as well as fish, frogs, birds, and bats
Phyllostomidae (leaf-nosed bat)	J. E. Gray, 1825 232 species in 61 genera (full list): Subfamily Carolliinae (short-tailed bat): Carollia (8 species); Subfamily Desmodontinae (vampire bat): Desmodus (1 species); Diaemus (1 species); Diphylla (1 species); Subfamily Glossophaginae (long-tongued bat): Anoura (10 species); Brachyphylla (2 species); Choeroniscus (3 species); Choeronycteris (1 species); Dryadonycteris (1 species); Erophylla (2 species); Glossophaga (9 species); Hylonycteris (1 species); Leptonycteris (3 species); Lichonycteris (2 species); Monophyllus (2 species); Musonycteris (1 species); Phyllonycteris (2 species); Platalina (1 species); Scleronycteris (1 species); Xeronycteris (1 species); Subfamily Glyphonycterinae (big-eared bat): Glyphonycteris (3 species); Neonycteris (1 species); Trinycteris (1 species); Subfamily Lonchophyllinae (nectar bat): Hsunycteris (4 species); Lionycteris (1 species); Lonchophylla (13 species); Subfamily Lonchorhininae (sword-nosed bat): Lonchorhina (6 species); Subfamily Macrotinae (leaf-nosed bat): Macrotus (2 species); Subfamily Micronycterinae (big-eared bat): Lampronycteris (1 species); Micronycteris (13 species); Subfamily Phyllostominae (round-eared or spear-nosed bat): Chrotopterus (1 species); Gardnerycteris (3 species); Lophostoma (8 species); Macrophyllum (1 species); Mimon (2 species); Phylloderma (2 species); Phyllostomus (4 species); Tonatia (3 species); Trachops (3 species); Vampyrum (1 species); Subfamily Rhinophyllinae (little fruit bat): Rhinophylla (3 species); Subfamily Stenodermatinae (yellow-shouldered or neotropical fruit bat): Ametrida (1 species); Ardops (1 species); Ariteus (1 species); Artibeus (13 species); Centurio (1 species); Chiroderma (7 species); Dermanura (11 species); Ectophylla (1 species); Enchisthenes (1 species); Mesophylla (1 species); Phyllops (1 species); Platyrrhinus (19 species, Recife broad-nosed bat pictured); Pygoderma (1 species); Sphaeronycteris (1 species); Stenoderma (1 species); Sturnira (25 species); Uroderma (5 species); Vampyressa (6 species); Vampyriscus (3 species); Vampyrodes (2 species)	South America, Central America, Caribbean, and southern North America	Size range: 3 cm (1 in) long, with no tail (little white-shouldered bat) to 13 cm (5 in) long, plus 4 cm (2 in) tail (greater spear-nosed bat) Habitats: Caves, savanna, forest, rocky areas, grassland, inland wetlands, shrubland, and desert Diets: Insects, fruit, nectar, and pollen, as well as small animals and blood
Thyropteridae (disk-winged bat)	Miller, 1907 5 species in 1 genus: Thyroptera (5 species, Peters's disk-winged bat pictured)	Central America and South America	Size range: 3 cm (1 in) long, plus 2 cm (1 in) (De Vivo's disk-winged bat) to 6 cm (2 in) long, plus 4 cm (2 in) tail (LaVal's disk-winged bat) Habitats: Forest and savanna Diets: Insects
Vespertilionidae (vesper bat)	J. E. Gray, 1821 561 species (3 extinct) in 61 genera (full lists): Subfamily Kerivoulinae (woolly or trumpet-eared bat, full list): Kerivoula (28 species); Phoniscus (4 species); Subfamily Murininae (tube-nosed bat, full list): Harpiocephalus (1 species); Harpiola (2 species); Murina (53 species); Subfamily Myotinae (mouse-eared bat, full list): Eudiscopus (1 species); Myotis (143 species); Submyotodon (3 species); Subfamily Vespertilioninae (pipistrelle or serotine, full list): Afronycteris (3 species); Afropipistrellus (5 species); Alionoctula (19 species); Antrozous (2 species); Arielulus (6 species); Baeodon (2 species); Barbastella (6 species); Bauerus (1 species); Cassistrellus (2 species); Chalinolobus (8 species); Cnephaeus (15 species); Corynorhinus (4 species); Eptesicus (2 species); Euderma (1 species); Falsistrellus (2 species); Glauconycteris (15 species); Glischropus (5 species); Hesperoptenus (5 species); Histiotus (11 species); Hypsugo (16 species); Ia (1 species); Idionycteris (1 species); Laephotis (9 species); Lasionycteris (1 species); Lasiurus (20 species); Mimetillus (1 species); Mirostrellus (1 species); Neoeptesicus (10 species); Neoromicia (6 species); Nyctalus (8 species); Nycticeinops (3 species); Nycticeius (3 species); Nyctophilus (17 species (1 extinct)); Otonycteris (2 species); Parastrellus (1 species); Perimyotis (1 species); Pharotis (1 species); Philetor (1 species); Pipistrellus (16 species (2 extinct), common pipistrelle pictured); Plecotus (18 species); Pseudoromicia (9 species); Rhogeessa (12 species); Rhyneptesicus (1 species); Scoteanax (1 species); Scotoecus (5 species); Scotomanes (1 species); Scotophilus (20 species); Scotorepens (4 species); Scotozous (1 species); Tylonycteris (6 species); Vansonia (1 species); Vespadelus (9 species); Vespertilio (2 species)	Worldwide except for Antarctica	Size range: 2 cm (1 in) long, plus 2 cm (1 in) tail (pygmy bamboo bat) to 13 cm (5 in) long, plus 10 cm (4 in) tail (Schreber's yellow bat) Habitats: Savanna, forest, caves, grassland, shrubland, desert, neritic marine, coastal marine, rocky areas, and inland wetlands Diets: Insects, as well as fish

Suborder Yinpterochiroptera – Springer, Teeling, Madsen, Stanhope, & de Jong, 2001 – seven families
Name	Authority and species	Range	Size and ecology
Craseonycteridae (Kitti's hog-nosed bat)	Hill, 1974 1 species in 1 genus: Craseonycteris (1 species, Kitti's hog-nosed bat pictured)	Thailand and Myanmar	Size: 2–4 cm (1–2 in) long, with no tail Habitats: Forest and caves Diet: Insects
Hipposideridae (Old World leaf-nosed bat)	Lydekker, 1891 94 species in 7 genera (full list): Anthops (1 species); Asellia (4 species); Aselliscus (3 species); Coelops (3 species); Doryrhina (2 species); Hipposideros (76 species, Khajuria's leaf-nosed bat pictured); Macronycteris (5 species)	Africa, Asia, and northern Australia	Size range: 3 cm (1 in) long, with no tail (Malayan tailless leaf-nosed bat) to 13 cm (5 in) long, plus 4 cm (2 in) tail (striped leaf-nosed bat) Habitats: Shrubland, forest, grassland, savanna, caves, desert, rocky areas, and inland wetlands Diets: Insects
Megadermatidae (false vampire bat)	H. Allen, 1864 7 species in 6 genera: Cardioderma (1 species); Eudiscoderma (1 species); Lavia (1 species); Lyroderma (2 species); Macroderma (1 species); Megaderma (1 species, lesser false vampire bat pictured)	Sub-Saharan Africa, southern and southeastern Asia, and northern Australia	Size range: 5 cm (2 in) long, with no tail (lesser false vampire bat) to 13 cm (5 in) long, with no tail (ghost bat) Habitats: Savanna, shrubland, forest, caves, desert, grassland, rocky areas, and inland wetlands Diets: Insects and small vertebrates
Pteropodidae (fruit bat or megabat)	J. E. Gray, 1821 204 species (6 extinct) in 46 genera (full list): Subfamily Cynopterinae (flying dog): Aethalops (2 species); Alionycteris (1 species); Balionycteris (2 species); Chironax (2 species); Cynopterus (7 species, lesser short-nosed fruit bat pictured); Dyacopterus (3 species); Haplonycteris (1 species); Latidens (1 species); Megaerops (4 species); Otopteropus (1 species); Penthetor (1 species); Ptenochirus (3 species); Sphaerias (1 species); Thoopterus (2 species); Subfamily Eidolinae (palm bat): Eidolon (2 species); Subfamily Harpyionycterinae (naked-backed fruit bat): Aproteles (1 species); Boneia (1 species); Dobsonia (14 species); Harpyionycteris (2 species); Subfamily Nyctimeninae (tube-nosed fruit bat): Nyctimene (16 species); Paranyctimene (2 species); Subfamily Pteropodinae (flying fox): Acerodon (5 species); Desmalopex (2 species); Mirimiri (1 species); Neopteryx (1 species); Pteralopex (5 species); Pteropus (66 species (6 extinct)); Styloctenium (2 species); Subfamily Rousettinae (fruit bat): Casinycteris (3 species); Eonycteris (3 species); Epomophorus (11 species); Epomops (2 species); Hypsignathus (1 species); Megaloglossus (2 species); Myonycteris (5 species); Nanonycteris (1 species); Pilonycteris (1 species); Plerotes (1 species); Rousettus (7 species); Scotonycteris (3 species); Stenonycteris (1 species); Subfamily Macroglossusinae (long-tongued fruit bat): Macroglossus (2 species); Melonycteris (1 species); Nesonycteris (4 species); Notopteris (2 species); Syconycteris (3 species)	Africa, Asia, and Australia	Size range: 4 cm (2 in) long, plus 0–1 cm (0.0–0.4 in) tail tail (long-tongued nectar bat) to 37 cm (15 in) long, with no tail (great flying fox) Habitats: Forest, caves, rocky areas, savanna, inland wetlands, grassland, and shrubland Diets: Fruit, as well as flowers, pollen, and nectar
Rhinolophidae (horseshoe bat)	J. E. Gray, 1825 92 species in 1 genus (full list): Rhinolophus (118 species, rufous horseshoe bat pictured)	Europe, Africa, Asia, and Australia	Size range: 3 cm (1 in) long, plus 1 cm (0.4 in) tail (Thai horseshoe bat) to 10 cm (4 in) long, plus 5 cm (2 in) tail (Maclaud's horseshoe bat) Habitats: Savanna, shrubland, forest, caves, desert, grassland, rocky areas, and inland wetlands Diets: Insects
Rhinonycteridae (trident bat)	J. E. Gray, 1866 9 species in 4 genera: Cloeotis (1 species); Paratriaenops (3 species); Rhinonicteris (1 species); Triaenops (4 species, Persian trident bat pictured)	Africa, western Asia, and northern Australia	Size range: 3 cm (1 in) long, plus 3 cm (1 in) (Percival's trident bat) to 8 cm (3 in) long, plus 4 cm (2 in) tail (African trident bat) Habitats: Forest, savanna, shrubland, caves, and rocky areas Diets: Insects
Rhinopomatidae (mouse-tailed bat)	Bonaparte, 1838 6 species in 1 genus: Rhinopoma (6 species, small mouse-tailed bat pictured)	Northern and eastern Africa and western and southern Asia	Size range: 5 cm (2 in) long, plus 5 cm (2 in) tail (Egyptian mouse-tailed bat) to 9 cm (4 in) long, plus 9 cm (4 in) tail (greater mouse-tailed bat) Habitats: Grassland, shrubland, rocky areas, caves, forest, and desert Diets: Insects

===== Eulipotyphla =====
Members of the Eulipotyphla order are called eulipotyphlans and include hedgehogs, shrews, and moles. They are found worldwide, and predominately eat insects, small vertebrates, and vegetation. Eulipotyphla comprises 4 families of 496 extant species in 53 genera. One additional species has been driven to extinction in modern times.

Not assigned to a named clade – four families
Name	Authority and species	Range	Size and ecology
Erinaceidae (hedgehog)	G. Fischer, 1814 24 species in 10 genera (full list): Subfamily Erinaceinae (hedgehog): Atelerix (4 species); Erinaceus (4 species, northern white-breasted hedgehog pictured); Hemiechinus (2 species); Mesechinus (2 species); Paraechinus (4 species); Subfamily Galericinae (gymnure): Echinosorex (1 species); Hylomys (3 species); Neohylomys (1 species); Neotetracus (1 species); Podogymnura (2 species)	Europe, Asia, and Africa, plus introduced to New Zealand	Size range: 9 cm (4 in) long, plus 1 cm (0.4 in) tail (short-tailed gymnure) to 31 cm (12 in) long, plus 4 cm (2 in) tail (northern white-breasted hedgehog) Habitats: Shrubland, desert, forest, grassland, inland wetlands, savanna, rocky areas, and caves Diets: Insects, other invertebrates, a wide range of vertebrates, and carrion, as well as vegetation
Solenodontidae (solenodon)	Gill, 1872 2 species in 2 genera: Atopogale (1 species); Solenodon (1 species, Hispaniolan solenodon pictured)	Cuba and Hispaniola	Size range: 20 cm (8 in) long, plus 13 cm (5 in) tail (Cuban solenodon) to 49 cm (19 in) long, plus 25 cm (10 in) tail (Hispaniolan solenodon) Habitats: Forest and caves Diets: Invertebrates, reptiles, fruit, vegetables, and birds
Soricidae (shrew)	G. Fischer, 1814 430 species (1 extinct) in 25 genera (full lists): Subfamily Crocidurinae (white-toothed shrew, full list): Crocidura (203 species, 1 extinct); Diplomesodon (1 species); Feroculus (1 species); Paracrocidura (3 species); Ruwenzorisorex (1 species); Scutisorex (2 species); Solisorex (1 species); Suncus (18 species); Sylvisorex (15 species); Subfamily Myosoricinae (African shrews, full list): Congosorex (3 species); Myosorex (19 species); Surdisorex (3 species); Subfamily Soricinae (red-toothed shrews, full list): Anourosorex (4 species); Blarina (4 species); Blarinella (3 species); Chimarrogale (6 species); Chodsigoa (9 species); Cryptotis (41 species, North American least shrew pictured); Episoriculus (4 species); Megasorex (1 species); Nectogale (1 species); Neomys (4 species); Notiosorex (4 species); Sorex (76 species); Soriculus (1 species)	Worldwide except for Australia and Antarctica	Size range: 3 cm (1 in) long, plus 2 cm (0.8 in) tail (Etruscan shrew) to 18 cm (7 in) long, plus 14 cm (6 in) tail (goliath shrew) Habitats: Shrubland, desert, coastal marine, rocky areas, forest, intertidal marine, grassland, inland wetlands, savanna, and caves Diets: Insects and small vertebrates, as well as seeds and other plant material
Talpidae (mole)	G. Fischer, 1814 24 species in 17 genera (full list): Subfamily Scalopinae (New World mole): Condylura (1 species); Parascalops (1 species); Scalopus (1 species, eastern mole pictured); Scapanulus (3 species); Scapanus (3 species); Subfamily Talpinae (Old World mole): Desmana (1 species); Dymecodon (1 species); Euroscaptor (7 species); Galemys (1 species); Mogera (1 species); Neurotrichus (1 species); Parascaptor (1 species); Scaptochirus (1 species); Scaptonyx (1 species); Talpa (11 species); Urotrichus (1 species); Subfamily Uropsilinae (shrew-like mole): Uropsilus (4 species)	North America, Europe, and Asia	Size range: 6 cm (2 in) long, plus 5 cm (2 in) tail (Chinese shrew mole) to 24 cm (9 in) long, plus 21 cm (8 in) tail (Russian desman) Habitats: Forest, shrubland, inland wetlands, grassland, and coastal marine Diets: Small animals and plants

===== Perissodactyla =====
Members of the Perissodactyla order are called perissodactyls or odd-toed ungulates, and include rhinoceroses, tapirs, and horses. They are found worldwide, and eat a variety of vegetation. Perissodactyla comprises 3 families of 18 extant species in 6 genera. These families are grouped into two suborders: Ceratomorpha, containing rhinoceroses and tapirs, and Hippomorpha, or horses.

Suborder Ceratomorpha – Wood, 1937 – two families
Name	Authority and species	Range	Size and ecology
Rhinocerotidae (rhinoceros)	J. E. Gray, 1821 5 species in 4 genera: Ceratotherium (1 species); Dicerorhinus (1 species); Diceros (1 species, black rhinoceros pictured); Rhinoceros (2 species)	Sub-Saharan Africa, northern India, Southeastern Asia	Size range: 236 cm (93 in) long, plus tail (Sumatran rhinoceros) to 420 cm (165 in) long, plus 70 cm (28 in) tail (white rhinoceros) Habitats: Savanna, shrubland, grassland, forest, desert, and inland wetlands Diets: Succulent plants, as well as a variety of other vegetation
Tapiridae (tapir)	J. E. Gray, 1821 4 species in 1 genus: Tapirus (4 species, Malayan tapir pictured)	South America, Central America, and scattered southeastern Asia	Size range: 180 cm (71 in) long, plus 10 cm (4 in) tail (mountain tapir) to 300 cm (118 in) long, plus 10 cm (4 in) tail (Malayan tapir) Habitats: Forest, shrubland, grassland, savanna, and inland wetlands Diets: Shoots, aquatic vegetation, leaves, buds, twigs, and fruit

Suborder Hippomorpha – Wood, 1937 – one family
Name	Authority and species	Range	Size and ecology
Equidae (horse or donkey)	J. E. Gray, 1821 9 species in 1 genus: Equus (9 species, horse pictured)	Africa and Asia, plus worldwide distribution of domesticated horse and donkey	Size range: 182 cm (72 in) long, plus 32 cm (13 in) tail (kiang) to 280 cm (110 in) long, plus 111 cm (44 in) tail (wild horse) Habitats: Shrubland, grassland, savanna, inland wetlands, and desert Diets: Grass and shrubs

===== Pholidota =====
Members of the Pholidota order are called pholidotans or pangolins. They are found in Sub-Saharan Africa and southern and southeastern Asia, and eat ants and termites, as well as other insects. Pholidota comprises a single family of eight extant species in three genera.

Not assigned to a named clade – two families
Name	Authority and species	Range	Size and ecology
Manidae (pangolin)	J. E. Gray, 1821 8 species in 3 genera: Subfamily Maninae (Asian pangolins): Manis (4 species, Chinese pangolin pictured); Subfamily Phatagininae (African tree pangolins): Phataginus (2 species); Subfamily Smutsiinae (African ground pangolins): Smutsia (2 species)	Sub-Saharan Africa and southern and southeastern Asia	Size range: 25 cm (10 in) long, plus 35 cm (14 in) tail (white-bellied pangolin) to 81 cm (32 in) long, plus 68 cm (27 in) tail (giant pangolin) Habitats: Savanna, forest, grassland, and shrubland Diets: Ants and termites, as well as other insects

==== Superorder Xenarthra ====
===== Cingulata =====
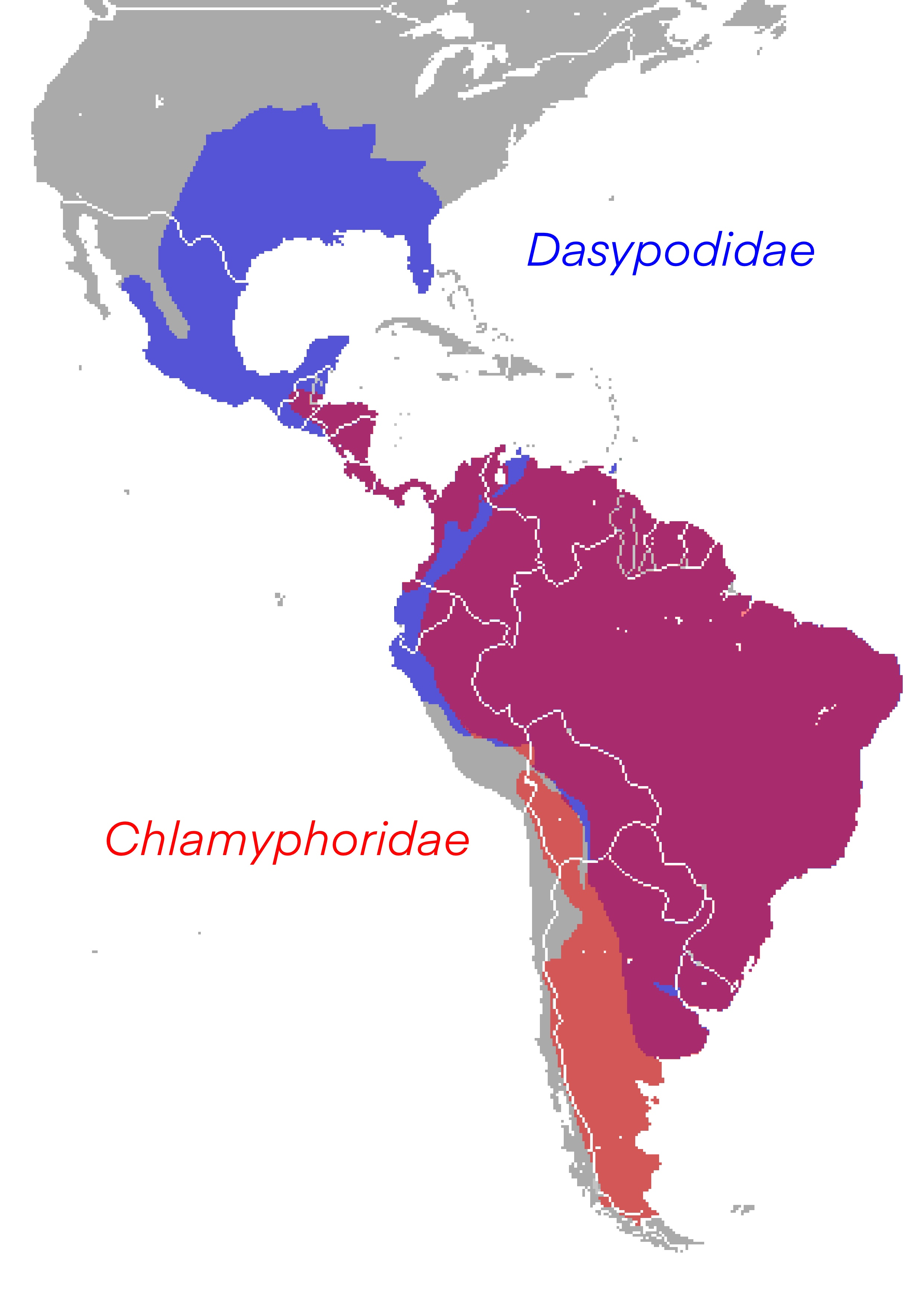
Cingulata distribution

Members of the Cingulata order are called cingulates or armadillos. They are found in South America and North America, and eat insects, other invertebrates, small reptiles, amphibians, and carrion. Cingulata comprises 2 families of 22 extant species in 9 genera.

Not assigned to a named clade – two families
Name	Authority and species	Range	Size and ecology
Dasypodidae (long-nosed armadillo)	J. E. Gray, 1821 9 species in 1 genus: Subfamily Dasypodinae: Dasypus (9 species, nine-banded armadillo pictured)	South America, and central, southern, and eastern North America	Size range: 24 cm (9 in) long, plus 12 cm (5 in) tail (seven-banded armadillo) to 90 cm (35 in) long, plus 43 cm (17 in) tail (hairy long-nosed armadillo) Habitats: Forest, savanna, shrubland, and grassland Diets: Insects, other invertebrates, small reptiles, and amphibians
Chlamyphoridae (armadillo)	Bonaparte, 1850 13 species in 8 genera: Subfamily Chlamyphorinae (fairy armadillo): Calyptophractus (1 species); Chlamyphorus (1 species); Subfamily Euphractinae (hairy armadillo): Chaetophractus (2 species); Euphractus (1 species, six-banded armadillo pictured); Zaedyus (1 species); Subfamily Tolypeutinae (armadillo): Cabassous (4 species); Priodontes (1 species); Tolypeutes (2 species)	South America and Central America	Size range: 11 cm (4 in) long, plus 2 cm (1 in) tail (pink fairy armadillo) to 100 cm (39 in) long, plus 50 cm (20 in) tail (giant armadillo) Habitats: Forest, savanna, shrubland, grassland, and desert Diets: Insects, spiders, worms, rodents, lizards, snakes, other small vertebrates, and carrion

===== Pilosa =====
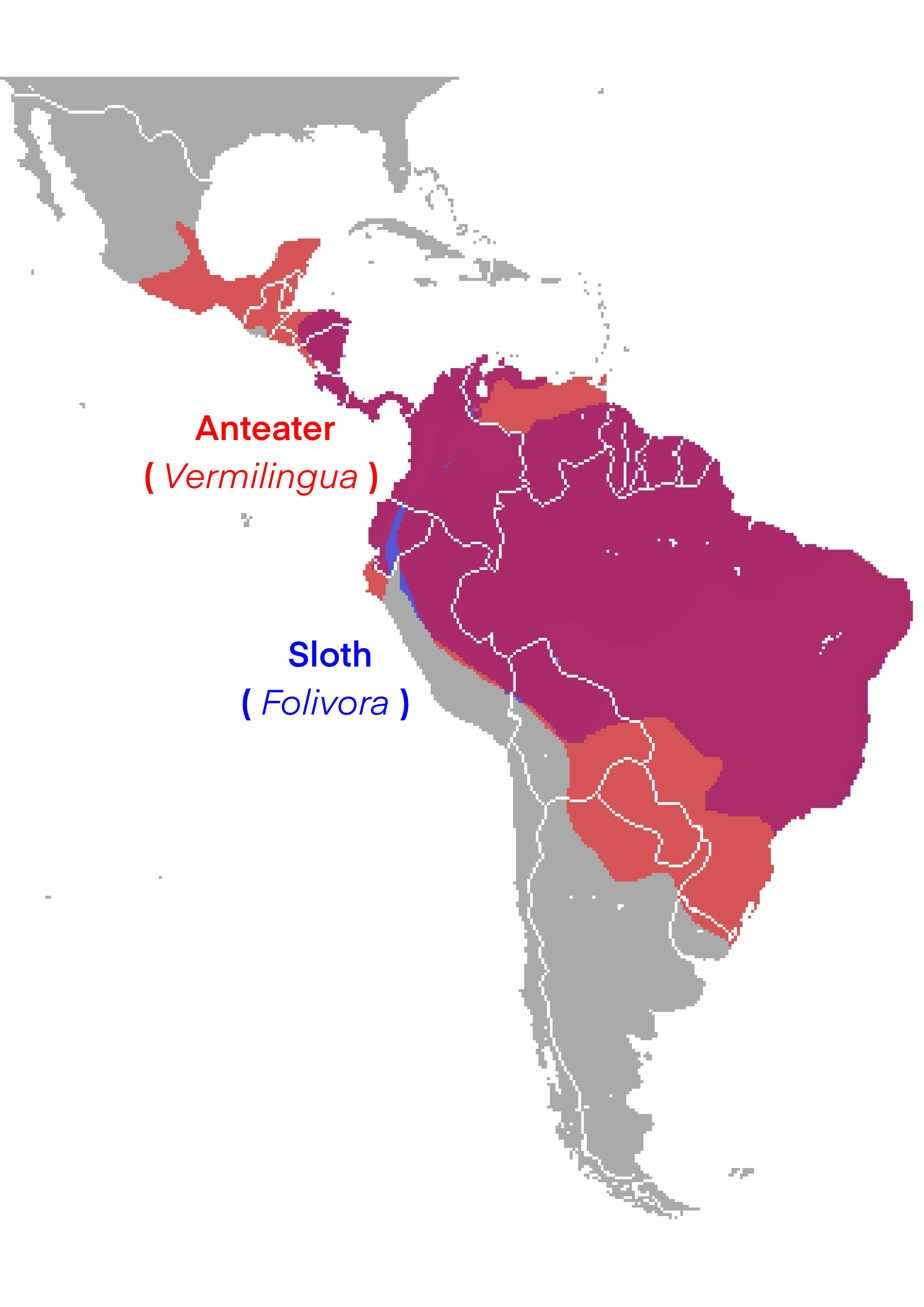
Pilosa distribution

Members of the Pilosa order are called pilosans and include sloths and anteaters. They are found in Mexico, Central America, and South America, and the sloths eat leaves, twigs, and fruit, while the anteaters eat ants, termites, and other insects. Pilosa comprises four families of sixteen extant species in five genera. These families are grouped into two suborders: Folivora, or sloths, and Vermilingua, or anteaters.

Suborder Folivora – Delsuc, Catzeflis, Stanhope, & Douzery, 2001 – two families
Name	Authority and species	Range	Size and ecology
Bradypodidae (three-toed sloth)	J. E. Gray, 1821 4 species in 1 genus: Bradypus (4 species, brown-throated sloth pictured)	Central America and northern South America	Size range: 45–75 cm (18–30 in) long, plus 2–11 cm (1–4 in) tail (pale-throated sloth) Habitats: Forest Diets: Leaves, twigs, and buds
Choloepodidae (two-toed sloth)	J. E. Gray, 1871 2 species in 1 genus: Choloepus (2 species, Hoffmann's two-toed sloth pictured)	Central America and northern South America	Size range: 50 cm (20 in) long, plus 1 cm (0 in) tail (Hoffmann's two-toed sloth) to 88 cm (35 in) long, plus 4 cm (2 in) tail (Linnaeus's two-toed sloth) Habitats: Forest, shrubland, and grassland Diets: Leaves, twigs, and fruit

Suborder Vermilingua – Illiger, 1811 – two families
Name	Authority and species	Range	Size and ecology
Cyclopedidae (silky anteater)	Pocock, 1924 7 species in 1 genus: Cyclopes (7 species, silky anteater pictured)	Central America and northern and eastern South America	Size: 18–21 cm (7–8 in) long, plus 17–22 cm (7–9 in) tail (multiple) Habitats: Forest Diet: Termites and other insects
Myrmecophagidae (anteater)	J. E. Gray, 1825 2 species in 1 genus: Myrmecophaga (1 species, giant anteater pictured); Tamandua (2 species)	Mexico, Central America, and South America	Size range: 47 cm (19 in) long, plus 40 cm (16 in) tail (southern tamandua) to 140 cm (55 in) long, plus 90 cm (35 in) tail (giant anteater) Habitats: Forest, savanna, shrubland, and grassland Diets: Ants, termites, and other insects

=== Monotremata ===
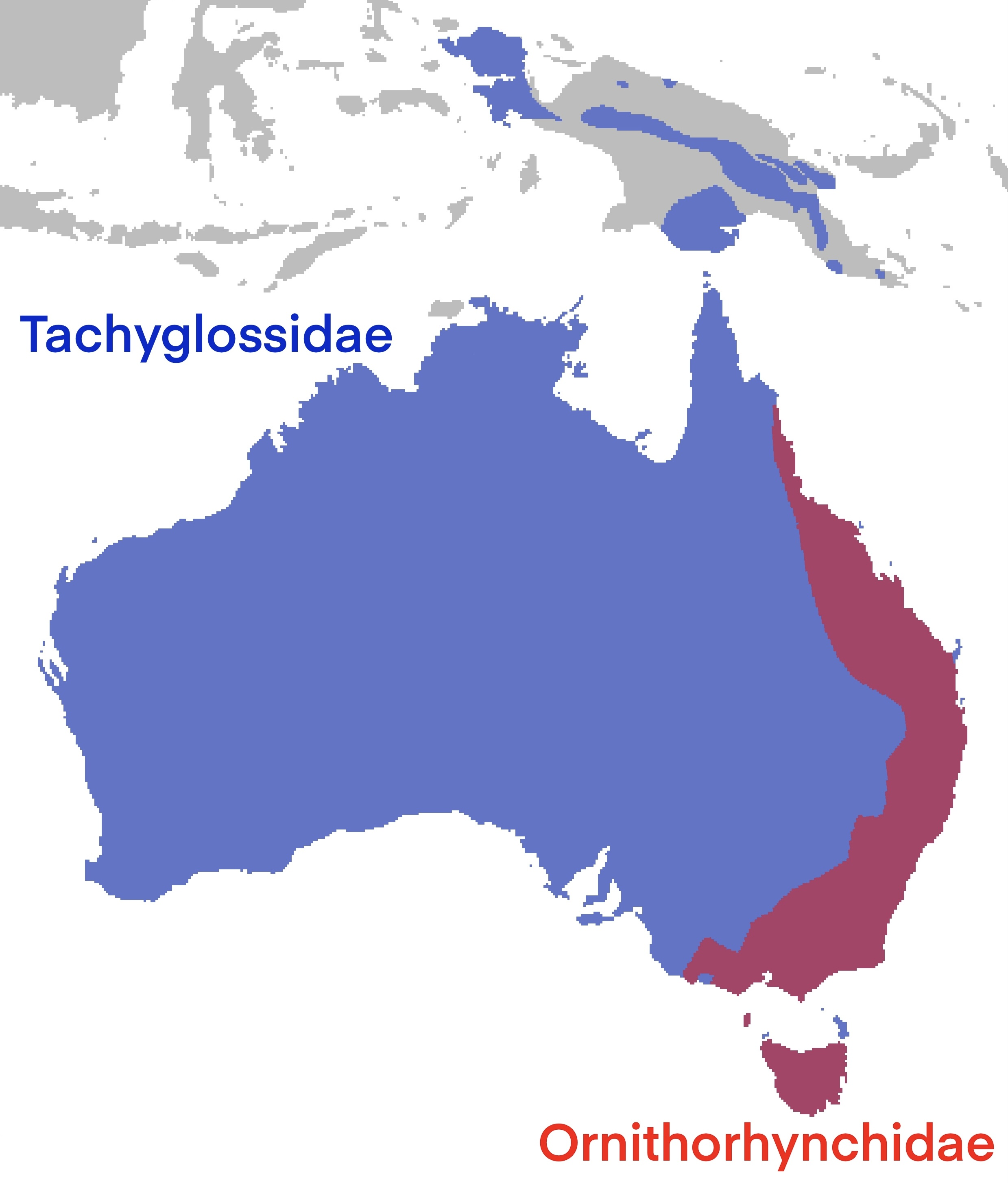
Monotremata distribution

Monotremata is the smallest of the three main divisions of mammals, containing only five extant species. It is distinguished from other mammals in that the monotremes are egg-laying rather than bearing live young, but, like all mammals, the female monotremes nurse their young with milk. Unlike the other two divisions, it is considered an order rather than an infraclass, and in turn contains two families of extant species grouped together in the superfamily Ornithorhynchoidea: Ornithorhynchidae, containing only the platypus, and Tachyglossidae, containing four species of echidna in two genera. Monotremes are found in Australia and New Guinea and are carnivorous, eating insects, worms, shrimp, tadpoles, and small fish.

Superfamily Ornithorhynchoidea – Flannery, McCurry, Rich, Vickers-Rich, Smith, & Helgen, 2024 – two families
Name	Authority and species	Range	Size and ecology
Ornithorhynchidae (platypus)	J. E. Gray, 1825 1 species in 1 genus: Ornithorhynchus (1 species, platypus pictured)	Eastern Australia	Size: 37–63 cm (15–25 in) long, plus tail Habitats: Inland wetlands Diet: Crayfish, shrimp, water insect larvae, snails, tadpoles, worms, and small fish
Tachyglossidae (echidna)	Gill, 1872 4 species in 2 genera: Tachyglossus (1 species, short-beaked echidna pictured); Zaglossus (3 species)	Australia and New Guinea	Size range: 30 cm (12 in) long (short-beaked echidna) to 63 cm (25 in) long (eastern long-beaked echidna) Habitats: Forest, savanna, shrubland, grassland, and desert Diets: Termites, ants, other insects, and worms

== Sources ==
- Chernasky, Amy; Motis, Anna; Burgin, Connor, eds. (2023). All the Mammals of the World. Lynx Nature Books. ISBN 978-84-16728-66-4.
- Feldhamer, G. A.; Drickamer, L. C.; Vessey, S. H.; Merritt, J. F.; Krajewski, C. (2007). Mammalogy: Adaptation, Diversity, Ecology (3rd ed.). Johns Hopkins University Press. ISBN 978-0-8018-8695-9. OCLC 124031907.
- Nowak, Ronald M. (1999). Walker's Mammals of the World. Vol. 1 (6th ed.). Johns Hopkins University Press. ISBN 978-0-8018-5789-8.
- Nowak, Ronald M. (1999). Walker's Mammals of the World. Vol. 2 (6th ed.). Johns Hopkins University Press. ISBN 978-0-8018-5789-8.
- Nowak, Ronald M. (2005). Walker's Marsupials of the World. Johns Hopkins University Press. ISBN 978-0-8018-8222-7.
- Power, M. L.; Schulkin, J. (2013). The Evolution of the Human Placenta. Johns Hopkins University Press. ISBN 978-1-4214-0643-5. OCLC 940749490.
- Wilson, Don E.; Reeder, DeeAnn M., eds. (2005). Mammal Species of the World. Vol. 1 (3rd ed.). Johns Hopkins University Press. ISBN 978-0-8018-8221-0.
