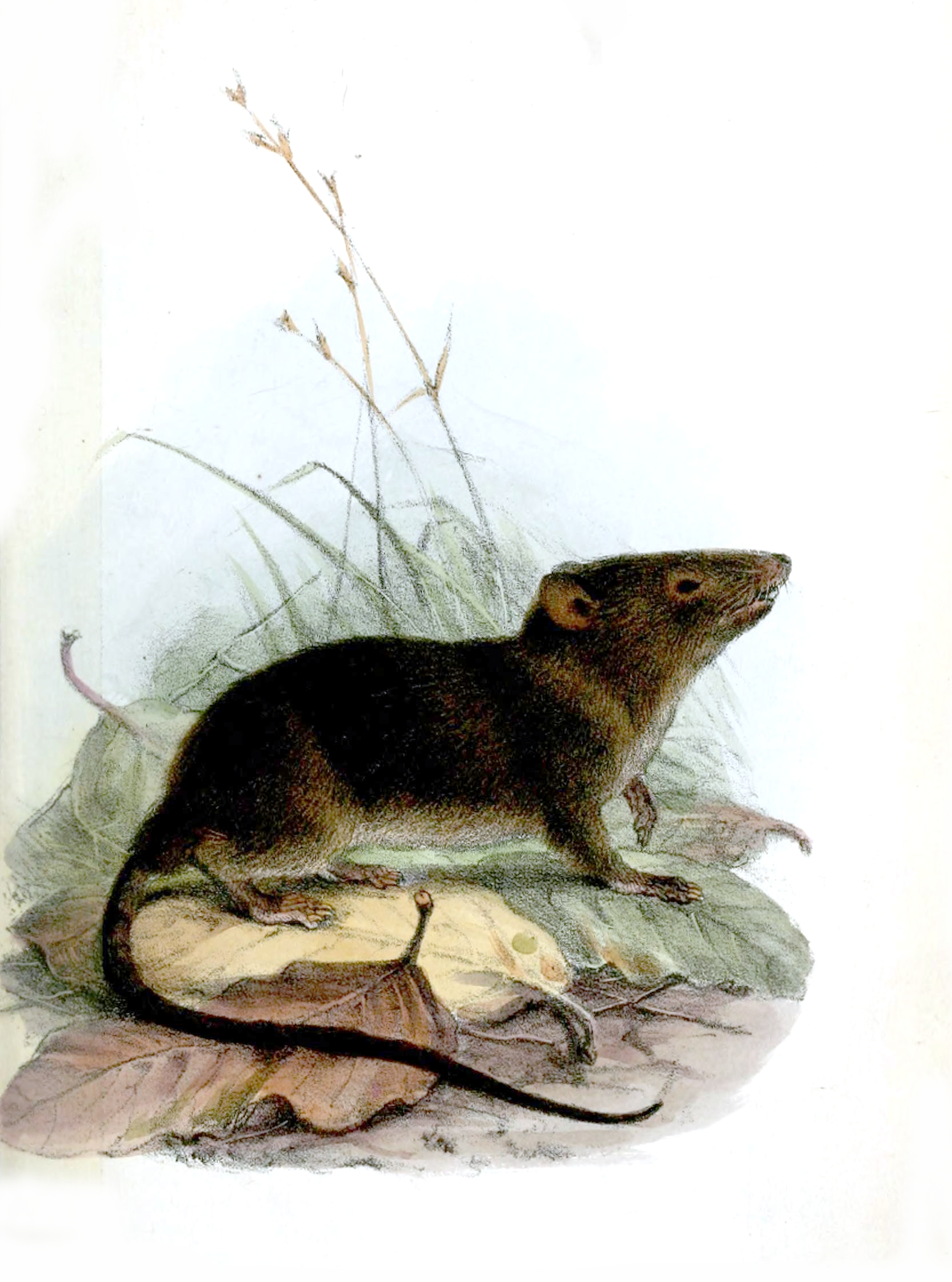

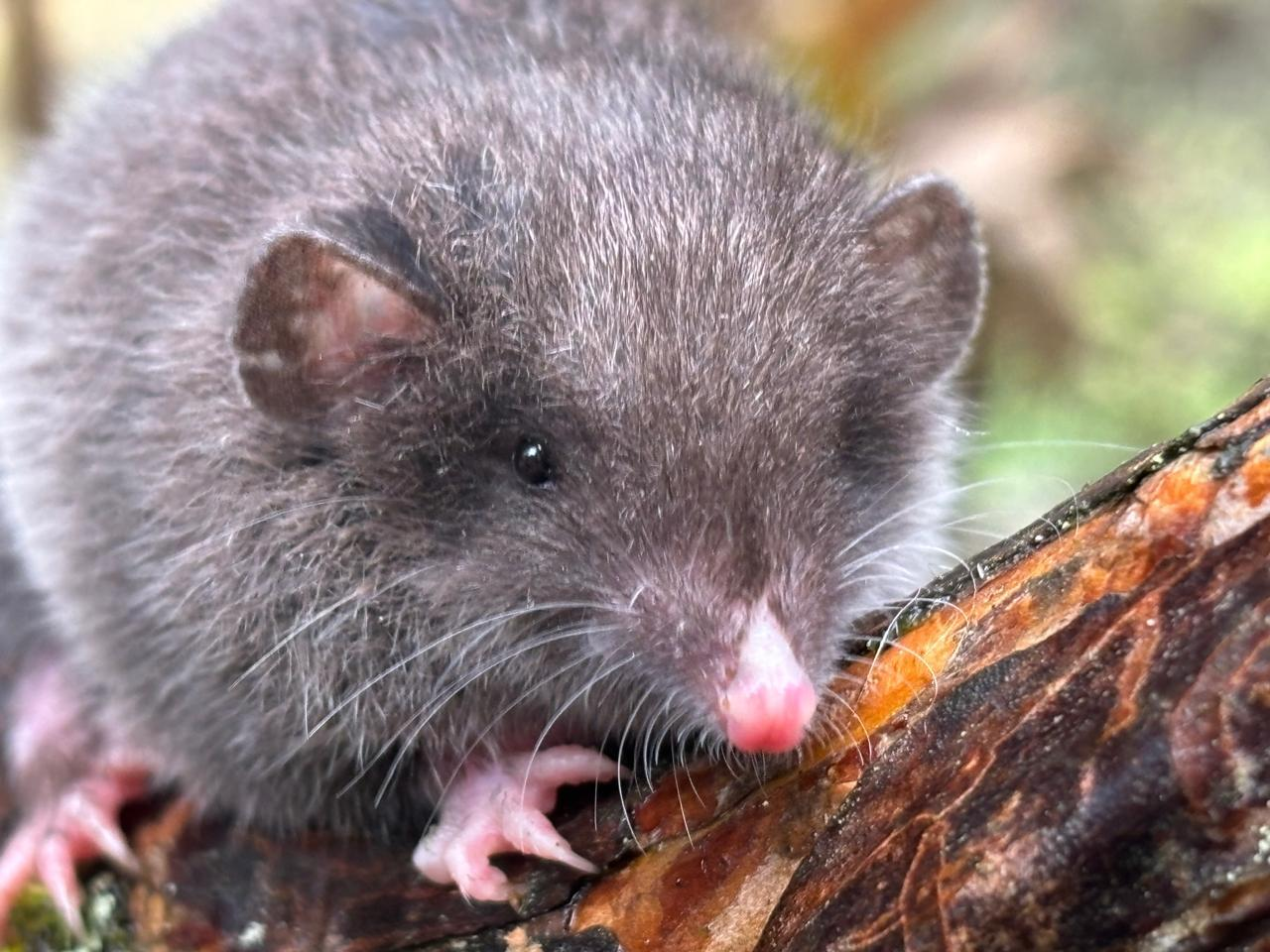

Conservation status
- Least Concern (IUCN 3.1)

Scientific classification
- Kingdom: Animalia
- Phylum: Chordata
- Class: Mammalia
- Infraclass: Marsupialia
- Order: Paucituberculata
- Family: Caenolestidae
- Genus: Caenolestes
- Species: C. fuliginosus

Binomial name
- Caenolestes fuliginosus (Tomes, 1863)

Subspecies
- C. f. centralis Bublitz, 1987; C. f. fuliginosus (Tomes, 1863); C. f. obscurus O. Thomas, 1895
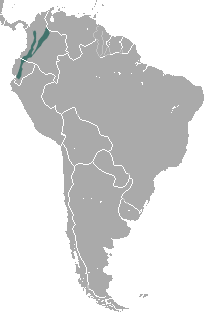
- Range of the dusky caenolestid

Synonyms
- Hyracodon fuliginosus (Tomes, 1863); Caenolestes obscurus Thomas, 1895; Caenolestes tatei H. E. Anthony, 1923

= Dusky caenolestid =

Species of marsupial

The dusky caenolestid (Caenolestes fuliginosus), also known as Tate's shrew opossum, is a shrew opossum from South America. The dusky caenolestid is characterized by a dark brown coat with a lighter underbelly, soft and thick fur, and a loosely haired tail. A nocturnal animal (active mainly at night), the dusky caenolestid lives on trees and feeds on insects and small invertebrates and vertebrates. It occurs in alpine and páramo forests in northern and western Colombia, Ecuador, and western Venezuela. The IUCN classifies this shrew opossum as least concern.

== Taxonomy and etymology ==
The dusky caenolestid is one of the five members of Caenolestes, and is placed in the family Caenolestidae (shrew opossums). It was first described by English zoologist Robert Fisher Tomes as Hyracodon fuliginosus in 1863. It was given its present binomial name by English zoologist Oldfield Thomas in 1895. In the latter part of 20th century, scientists believed that Caenolestes is closely related to Lestoros (the Incan caenolestid). Over the years, it became clear that Lestoros is morphologically different from Caenolestes. A 2013 morphological and mitochondrial DNA-based phylogenetic study showed that the Incan caenolestid and the long-nosed caenolestid (Rhyncholestes raphanurus) form a clade sister to Caenolestes. The cladogram below is based on this study.

- - - Gray short-tailed opossum (Monodelphis domestica)
    - Brown four-eyed opossum (Metachirus nudicaudatus)
    - - - Incan caenolestid (Lestoros inca)
        - Long-nosed caenolestid (Rhyncholestes raphanurus)
      - Caenolestes
        - Northern caenolestid (C. convelatus)
        - - Dusky caenolestid (C. fuliginosus)
          - - Andean caenolestid (C. condorensis)
            - - Gray-bellied caenolestid (C. caniventer)
              - Eastern caenolestid (C. sangay)

Three subspecies are recognized:

- C. f. centralis Bublitz, 1987: Occurs in the Andean natural region (Colombia) and extreme west of Venezuela.
- C. f. fuliginosus (Tomes, 1863): Occurs in central Ecuador.
- C. f. obscurus Thomas, 1895: Occurs around Bogotá (Colombia).

Caenolestid fossils date to as early as the early Eocene (nearly 55 mya). The generic name Caenolestes derives from the Greek words kainos ("new") and lestes ("robber", "pirate").

== Description ==
The dusky caenolestid is characterized by a dark brown coat with a lighter underbelly, soft and thick fur, and a loosely haired tail. The head-and-body length is between 9.3 and 13.5 centimetres (3.7 and 5.3 in), the tail measures 9.3 to 12.7 centimetres (3.7 to 5.0 in) and hindfeet are 2.2 centimetres (0.87 in) long. The ears and eyes are smaller and the rostrum is longer than in other caenolestids. The forefeet have five digits each; while two of them are blunt, the other three digits bear sharp claws. The toes of the hindfeet bear sharp claws as well, except for the biggest toe. There are four teats and no pouch. A 2007 study recorded dental anomalies such as missing teeth and supernumerary teeth.

== Ecology and behavior ==
The dusky caenolestid is nocturnal (active mainly at night), and lives on trees. It can be a fast runner, like the Incan caenolestid, though it does not move in leaps and jumps. The dusky caenolestid is reported to have a poor vision, though its sense of smell and hearing are good. Diet consists of lepidopteran larvae, insects, rodents, arachnids and centipedes; plant material may be eaten as well. The tail, though prehensile, may not be able to support the animal when it hangs down a branch.

== Distribution and status ==
The dusky caenolestid inhabits alpine and páramo forests in northern and western Colombia, Ecuador, and western Venezuela. It can occur in an altitudinal range of 1,600–4,000 metres (5,200–13,100 ft) above the sea level. The IUCN classifies it as least concern given its wide distribution and presumably large numbers. The caenolestid faces competition from the wandering small-eared shrew, and is thus rare, in montane regions of Ecuador. Cattle grazing is a major factor in habitat degradation.
