= Andean caenolestid =

Conservation status
- Vulnerable (IUCN 3.1)

Scientific classification
- Kingdom: Animalia
- Phylum: Chordata
- Class: Mammalia
- Infraclass: Marsupialia
- Order: Paucituberculata
- Family: Caenolestidae
- Genus: Caenolestes
- Species: C. condorensis

Binomial name
- Caenolestes condorensis Albuja and Patterson, 1996
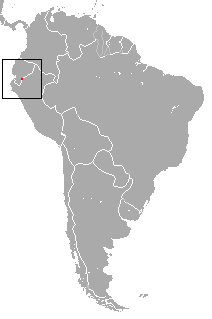
- Range of C. condorensis

Species of marsupial

The Andean caenolestid (Caenolestes condorensis), also known as the Andean shrew opossum or Condor caenolestid, is a shrew opossum known only from Cordillera del Cóndor (Ecuador), its type locality. It was first described by zoologists Bruce D. Patterson and Luis Albuja in 1996. It is the largest caenolestid. The IUCN classifies it as vulnerable. As of 2015, the population is estimated at less than 1,000.

== Taxonomy and etymology ==
The Andean caenolestid is one of the five members of Caenolestes, and is placed in the family Caenolestidae (shrew opossums). It was first described by zoologists Bruce D. Patterson (of the Field Museum of Natural History) and Luis Albuja (of the National Polytechnic School) in 1996 from an adult male specimen captured from Cordillera del Cóndor (Ecuador). They procured a total of three specimens.

In the latter part of 20th century, scientists believed that Caenolestes is closely related to Lestoros (the Incan caenolestid). Over the years, it became clear that Lestoros is morphologically different from Caenolestes. A 2013 morphological and mitochondrial DNA-based phylogenetic study showed that the Incan caenolestid and the long-nosed caenolestid (Rhyncholestes raphanurus) form a clade sister to Caenolestes. The cladogram below is based on this study.

- - - Gray short-tailed opossum (Monodelphis domestica)
    - Brown four-eyed opossum (Metachirus nudicaudatus)
    - - - Incan caenolestid (Lestoros inca)
        - Long-nosed caenolestid (Rhyncholestes raphanurus)
      - Caenolestes
        - Northern caenolestid (C. convelatus)
        - - Dusky caenolestid (C. fuliginosus)
          - - Andean caenolestid (C. condorensis)
            - - Gray-bellied caenolestid (C. caniventer)
              - Eastern caenolestid (C. sangay)

Caenolestid fossils date to as early as the early Eocene (nearly 55 mya). The generic name Caenolestes derives from the Greek words kainos ("new") and lestes ("robber", "pirate"). The specific epithet condorensis is based on the name of the type locality, Cordillera del Cóndor. It is also known by the name 'Condor caenolestid'.

== Description ==
Patterson and Albuja identified the Andean caenolestid as the largest in its family. It is characterized by large, heavy canines, long rostrum (nearly 2 cm (0.79 in) long), massive skull (nearly 3.8 cm (1.5 in) long), whitish whiskers, dark brown coat, and a dark spot on the chest. The mean external measurements recorded from the three specimens were as follows: the total length was 26 cm (10 in), the weight was 48 g (1.7 oz), the tail was 13 cm (5.1 in) long, the hindfeet measured 3 cm (1.2 in) and the ears 1.8 cm (0.71 in). Sexual dimorphism is prominent, with males larger than females.

== Distribution and status ==
The Andean caenolestid is known only from Cordillera del Cóndor, which is located in the eastern Andes. The locality is characterized by ash deposits dating to the Cretaceous, vegetation less than 1.5 metres (4.9 ft) in height and bromeliads (locally known as "achupallas"). The specimens were captured on the ecotone (interface) between the short grassy vegetation of the plateau and the higher, wooded slopes. The IUCN classifies it as vulnerable. As of 2015, the population is estimated at less than 1,000.
