= Long-nosed caenolestid =

Conservation status
- Near Threatened (IUCN 3.1)

Scientific classification
- Kingdom: Animalia
- Phylum: Chordata
- Class: Mammalia
- Infraclass: Marsupialia
- Order: Paucituberculata
- Family: Caenolestidae
- Genus: Rhyncholestes; Osgood, 1924
- Species: R. raphanurus

Binomial name
- Rhyncholestes raphanurus Osgood, 1924

Subspecies
- R. r. continentalis Bublitz, 1987; R. r. raphanurus Osgood, 1924
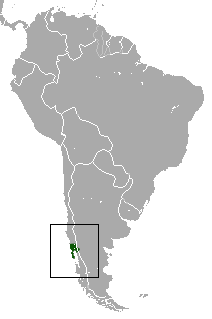
- Range of the long-nosed caenolestid

Synonyms
- Rhyncholestes continentalis Bublitz, 1987

Species of marsupial

The long-nosed caenolestid (Rhyncholestes raphanurus), also known as the Chilean shrew opossum or long-nosed shrew opossum, is a shrew opossum that occurs in temperate forests of Argentina and southern Chile. It was first described by American zoologist Wilfred Hudson Osgood in 1924. The long-nosed caenolestid resembles Caenolestes species in morphology. It is characterized by a long, pointed snout, small eyes and ears, and one claw on a digit of each of the thin limbs. Little is known of its behavior; it appears to be terrestrial (lives on land), nocturnal (active mainly at night) and omnivorous. It prefers cool, moist areas, and has a small distribution. It is classified as near threatened by the IUCN.

== Taxonomy and etymology ==
The long-nosed caenolestid is the sole member of its genus, and is classified in the family Caenolestidae. It was first described by American zoologist Wilfred Hudson Osgood in 1924. Two subspecies are recognised:

- R. r. continentalis Bublitz, 1987: Occurs in Argentina and Chile (type locality: Cerro la Picada in Los Lagos, Chile).
- R. r. raphanurus Osgood, 1924: Occurs in southern Chiloé Island (off the coast of Chile).

A 2013 morphological and mitochondrial DNA-based phylogenetic study showed that the Incan caenolestid (Lestoros inca) and the long-nosed caenolestid form a clade sister to Caenolestes. The cladogram below is based on this study.

- - - Gray short-tailed opossum (Monodelphis domestica)
    - Brown four-eyed opossum (Metachirus nudicaudatus)
    - - - Incan caenolestid (Lestoros inca)
        - Long-nosed caenolestid (Rhyncholestes raphanurus)
      - Caenolestes
        - Northern caenolestid (C. convelatus)
        - - Dusky caenolestid (C. fuliginosus)
          - - Andean caenolestid (C. condorensis)
            - - Gray-bellied caenolestid (C. caniventer)
              - Eastern caenolestid (C. sangay)

Caenolestid fossils date to as early as the early Eocene (nearly 55 mya). The generic name derives from the Greek words rhynchos ("snout") and lestes ("robber", "pirate"). The specific name comes from the Greek raphanos ("cabbage"), referring to the thick tail of this caenolestid. The Spanish name for this caenolestid, comadrejita trompuda, is the combination of comadreja ("weasel") and trompa ("snout"). Other names for this shrew opossum are Chilean shrew opossum or Chilean caenolestid.

== Description ==
The long-nosed caenolestid resembles Caenolestes species in morphology. In his 1924 account, Osgood recorded external measurements of three specimens. The total length ranged from 17.5 to 21.5 centimetres (6.9 to 8.5 in), skull length was between 3 and 3.5 centimetres (1.2 and 1.4 in) and hind feet measured 19.5 to 23.5 millimetres (0.77 to 0.93 in). The smooth coat is dark greyish brown, without countershading (greater pigmentation on the upper side). It is characterized by a long, pointed snout, small eyes and ears, and one claw on a digit of each of the thin limbs. This shrew opossum lacks a marsupium (young are attached to the nipples) and has seven nipples, unlike the four typical of other caenolestids. The tail helps in balancing the body during locomotion; the relatively shorter tail could imply lesser agility in the long-nosed caenolestid in comparison to other caenolestids. Moreover, the tail can be used to store fat, and is reportedly thickest during early winter.

A 2007 study recorded dental anomalies such as missing teeth and supernumerary teeth. The rodent-like incisors help in killing vertebrate prey and searching for insects in crevices. The pattern of tooth eruption appears to be largely consistent in all caenolestids – the eruption of procumbent (trailing along the surface without spreading out roots) incisors, followed by the development of closely spaced incisors that distance from one another as the mandible grows, and then the eruption of molars and premolars.

== Ecology and behavior ==
Little is known of the behavior of the long-nosed caenolestid. It appears to be terrestrial (lives on land) and nocturnal (active mainly at night). An omnivore, it feeds on insects and small invertebrates as well as plant material and fungi. The caenolestid appears to live in burrows and fallen logs; nests may be used temporarily. Lactating females have been reported in May as well as from October to March. The long-nosed caenolestid is a nocturnal species.

== Distribution and status ==
The long-nosed caenolestid occurs in temperate forests of Argentina and southern Chile, and up to altitudes of 1,135 metres (3,724 ft) above the sea level (in Osorno Province, Chile). It prefers cool, moist areas. By 2011 it was known from less than 25 locations, having a very small distribution. This shrew opossum also marks the southern limit of the distribution of caenolestids. In 2023 the species was reported from 17 sites within the Valdivian Coastal Reserve and the Alerce Costero National Park. Though locally abundant, the survival of the caenolestid is threatened by deforestation. Its population has declined by nearly 20% since the 1990s due to deforestation and human settlement. The IUCN classifies the long-nosed caenolestid as near threatened.
