= Incan caenolestid =

Conservation status
- Least Concern (IUCN 3.1)

Scientific classification
- Kingdom: Animalia
- Phylum: Chordata
- Class: Mammalia
- Infraclass: Marsupialia
- Order: Paucituberculata
- Family: Caenolestidae
- Genus: Lestoros; Oehser, 1934
- Species: L. inca

Binomial name
- Lestoros inca (O. Thomas, 1917)
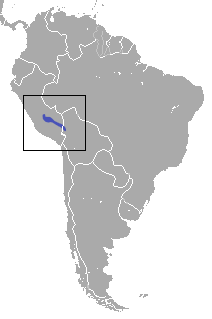
- Range of the Incan shrew opossum

Synonyms
- Genus-level: Orolestes O. Thomas, 1917; Cryptolestes Tate, 1934; Species-level: Orolestes inca O. Thomas, 1917; Cryptolestes inca (O. Thomas, 1917; Caenolestes inca (O. Thomas, 1917); Caenolestes gracilis Bublitz, 1987

Species of marsupial

The Incan caenolestid (Lestoros inca), also known as the Incan shrew opossum or Peruvian caenolestid, is a caenolestid found in the southern Peruvian Andes. It was first described by English zoologist Oldfield Thomas in 1917. The head-and-body length ranges from 9 to 11.5 centimetres (3.5 to 4.5 in), and the weight is between 25 and 32 grams (0.88 and 1.13 oz). It is brown on the back, and lighter on the underside. Little is known about the behaviour of the Incan caenolestid; it appears to be terrestrial and nocturnal. It feeds on small invertebrates and insects. This caenolestid inhabits elfin and secondary forests. The IUCN classifies it as least concern.

== Taxonomy ==
The Incan caenolestid is the sole member of its genus, Lestoros, and is placed in the family Caenolestidae (shrew opossums). It was first described by English zoologist Oldfield Thomas as Orolestes inca in 1917. In 1934, the shrew opossum was given its present binomial name. Caenolestid fossils date to as early as the early Eocene (nearly 55 mya).

In the latter part of 20th century, scientists believed that Lestoros is closely related to Caenolestes (common shrew opossums). Over the years, it became clear that Lestoros is morphologically different from Caenolestes. A 2013 morphological and mitochondrial DNA-based phylogenetic study showed that the Incan caenolestid and the long-nosed caenolestid (Rhyncholestes raphanurus) form a clade sister to Caenolestes. The cladogram below is based on this study.

- - - Gray short-tailed opossum (Monodelphis domestica)
    - Brown four-eyed opossum (Metachirus nudicaudatus)
    - - - Incan caenolestid (Lestoros inca)
        - Long-nosed caenolestid (Rhyncholestes raphanurus)
      - Caenolestes
        - Northern caenolestid (C. convelatus)
        - - Dusky caenolestid (C. fuliginosus)
          - - Andean caenolestid (C. condorensis)
            - - Gray-bellied caenolestid (C. caniventer)
              - Eastern caenolestid (C. sangay)

== Description ==
The Incan caenolestid, like the common shrew opossums, is characterized by a long snout and small eyes. A 2013 study gave a detailed analysis of the morphology of this shrew opossum. The Incan caenolestid appeared to be closer to Caenolestes than to the long-nosed caenolestid in morphology. Sexual dimorphism was not prominent. External measurements recorded were as follows: the head-and-body length ranged from 9 to 11.5 centimetres (3.5 to 4.5 in), the tail length ranged from 9.5 to 13.5 centimetres (3.7 to 5.3 in), and ear length was between 1.4 and 1.7 centimetres (0.55 and 0.67 in). Weight ranges from 25 to 32 grams (0.88 to 1.13 oz). Basically dark brown on the back, the caenolestid may have a lighter underbelly.

This caenolestid has a relatively stronger cranium and shorter mandible, suggesting that it can feed on tougher material than can other shrew opossums. The rostrum is not as well-developed as in the long-nosed caenolestid. The dental formula is 4.1.3.43.1.3.4. The long, blade-like structure of the molars and premolars could suggest a diet of soft invertebrates. The pattern of tooth eruption appears to be largely consistent in all caenolestids – the eruption of procumbent (trailing along the surface without spreading out roots) incisors, followed by the development of closely spaced incisors that distance from one another as the mandible grows, and then the eruption of molars and premolars. Like most caenolestids, it may have dental anomalies such as missing or supernumerary teeth. The study noted several differences in the dentition of the Incan caenolestid and common shrew opossums.

== Ecology and behavior ==
Little is known of the behavior of the Incan caenolestid. Observations suggest it is terrestrial and nocturnal. Like other caenolestids, it feeds on insects and small invertebrates. It is known to host several ectoparasites, such as Pterygodermatites.

== Distribution and status ==
The Incan caenolestid is known to occur in elfin forests, secondary forests, Baccharis scrubs, and at altitudes ranging from 2,100 to 3,600 metres (6,900 to 11,800 ft) above the sea level in moist habitats. It is found mainly in the southern Peruvian Andes, and its range extends from southeastern Peru to the extreme west of Bolivia in northwestern South America. The Incan caenolestid is classified as least concern by the IUCN due to its wide distribution in its local habitat, presumably large population, and occurrence across several protected areas. There are no major threats to its survival.
