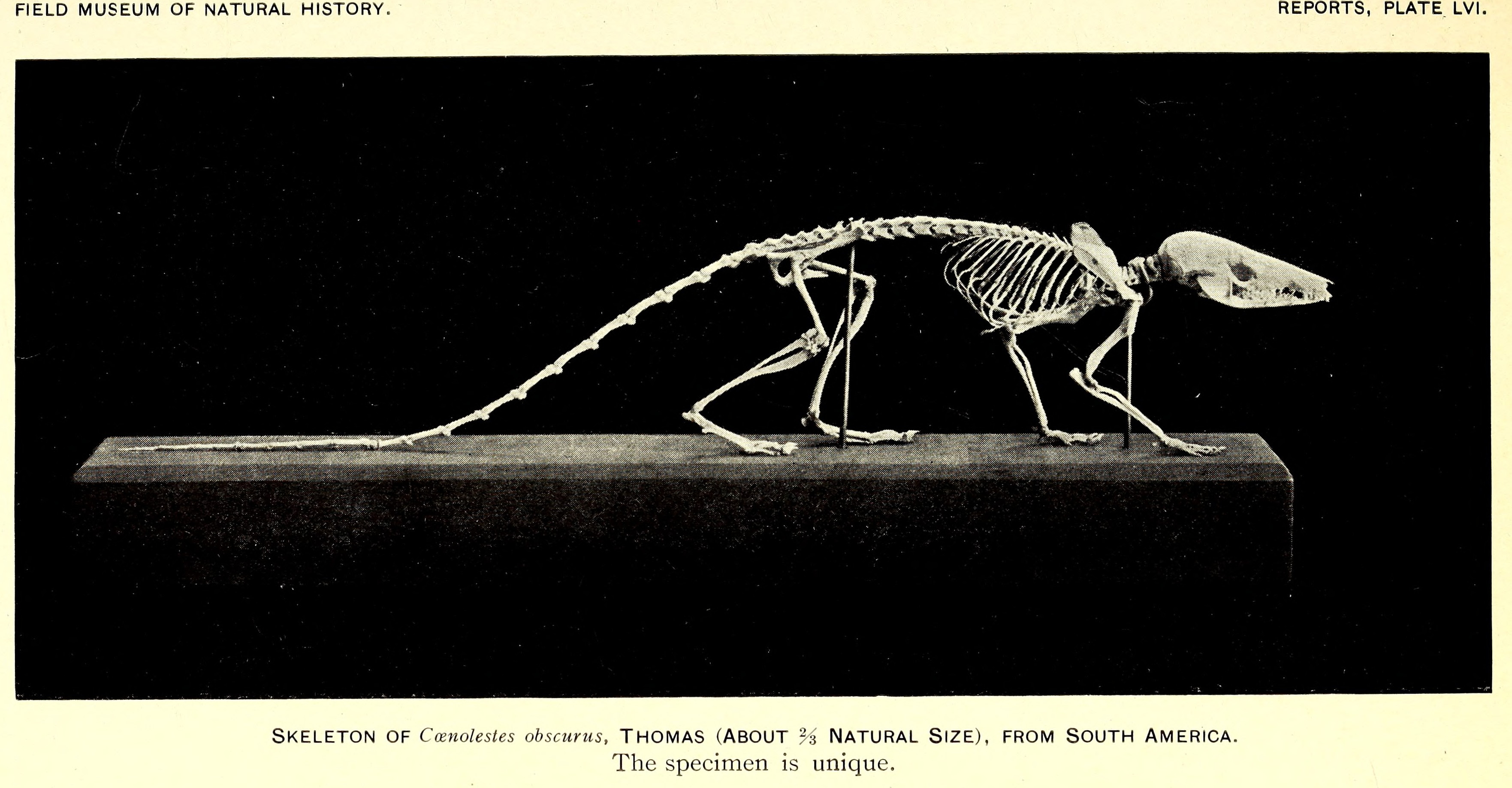
- Skeleton, Field Museum

Conservation status
- Vulnerable (IUCN 3.1)

Scientific classification
- Kingdom: Animalia
- Phylum: Chordata
- Class: Mammalia
- Infraclass: Marsupialia
- Order: Paucituberculata
- Family: Caenolestidae
- Genus: Caenolestes
- Species: C. convelatus

Binomial name
- Caenolestes convelatus Anthony, 1924

Subspecies
- C. c. barbarensis Bublitz, 1987; C. c. convelatus H. E. Anthony, 1924
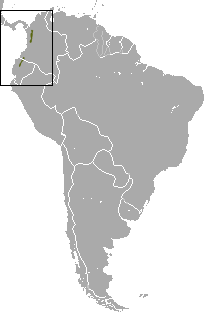
- Range of the northern caenolestid

Synonyms
- Caenolestes obscurus Lönnberg, 1921

= Northern caenolestid =

Species of marsupial

The northern caenolestid (Caenolestes convelatus), also known as the blackish shrew opossum, is a shrew opossum found in Colombia and Ecuador. It is listed as Vulnerable by the IUCN.

== Taxonomy and etymology ==
The northern caenolestid is one of the five members of Caenolestes, and is placed in the family Caenolestidae (shrew opossums). It was first described by American zoologist Harold Elmer Anthony in 1924. In the latter part of 20th century, scientists believed that Caenolestes is closely related to Lestoros (the Incan caenolestid). Over the years, it became clear that Lestoros is morphologically different from Caenolestes. A 2013 morphological and mitochondrial DNA-based phylogenetic study showed that the Incan caenolestid and the long-nosed caenolestid (Rhyncholestes raphanurus) form a clade sister to Caenolestes. The cladogram below is based on this study.

- - - Gray short-tailed opossum (Monodelphis domestica)
    - Brown four-eyed opossum (Metachirus nudicaudatus)
    - - - Incan caenolestid (Lestoros inca)
        - Long-nosed caenolestid (Rhyncholestes raphanurus)
      - Caenolestes
        - Northern caenolestid (C. convelatus)
        - - Dusky caenolestid (C. fuliginosus)
          - - Andean caenolestid (C. condorensis)
            - - Gray-bellied caenolestid (C. caniventer)
              - Eastern caenolestid (C. sangay)

Two subspecies are recognized:

- C. c. barbarensis Bublitz, 1987: Occurs in western Colombia
- C. c. convelatus H. E. Anthony, 1924: Occurs in northwestern Ecuador

Caenolestid fossils date to as early as the early Eocene (nearly 55 mya). The generic name Caenolestes derives from the Greek words kainos ("new") and lestes ("robber", "pirate").

== Description ==
The northern caenolestid is similar to the gray-bellied caenolestid in coat coloration but differs in cranial features. Kirsch and Waller (1979) gave the following measurements for 1 adult male captured in Colombia in 1969:

- Total length (mm) : 222
- Tail length (mm) : 114
- Hindfoot (mm) : 18
- Ear length (mm) : 14
- Weight (grams) : 25.0

== Distribution and habitat ==
The northern caenolestid occurs in and around alpine and secondary forests. The populations appear to have been divided into two parts – the Andes of western Colombia and northcentral Ecuador. It occurs in an altitudinal range of 1,800 to 3,800 metres (5,900 to 12,500 ft) in Colombia, though in Ecuador it has been recorded at a height of 4,100 metres (13,500 ft). In 2008, the IUCN classified the northern caenolestid as Vulnerable because it is known only from an area of 20,000 square kilometres (7,700 sq mi). Deforestation is a major threat, and more severe in Ecuador.
