= Bruce D. Patterson =

American mammalogist

- Born: August 18, 1952 (age 74); Coco Solo, Panama Canal Zone
- Education: St. Lawrence University; New Mexico State University
- Known for: Research on mammalian systematics, biogeography, and conservation
- Awards: C. Hart Merriam Award (2015)
- Scientific career
- Fields: Mammalogy, evolutionary biology
- Workplaces: Field Museum of Natural History
- Doctoral advisor: Wirt Atmar; Ralph James Raitt Jr.

Bruce D. Patterson (born August 18, 1952) is an American mammalogist and curator emeritus of mammals at the Field Museum of Natural History in Chicago, Illinois. His research focuses on the diversification, systematics, biogeography, ecology, and conservation of tropical mammals, particularly rodents, bats, and South American marsupials.

== Biography ==
Patterson moved to the United States in 1954. He received a Bachelor of Science degree from St. Lawrence University in Canton, New York, in 1974, followed by a Master of Science degree from New Mexico State University in Las Cruces, New Mexico, in 1978. In 1981, he earned a Ph.D. from New Mexico State University. His dissertation was titled The mandibular morphology of grasshoppers and the niche variation hypothesis, and his doctoral advisors were Wirt Atmar and Ralph James Raitt Jr..

Patterson began his career at the Field Museum of Natural History in 1981 as an assistant curator. He became associate curator in 1985 and served as head of the Department of Mammals from 1986 to 1992. He was curator at the museum from 1992 to 1996 and subsequently became the MacArthur Curator of Mammals. He also taught at Northwestern University in Evanston, Illinois, from 1984 to 1985.

In addition to his museum appointments, Patterson has held several academic positions. Since 1988, he has been a lecturer with the Committee on Evolutionary Biology at the University of Chicago. From 1991 to 2001, he was an adjunct lecturer at Northern Illinois University in DeKalb, Illinois. Between 1993 and 2008, he was a visiting professor at the Museo de Historia Natural of the National University of San Marcos in Lima, Peru. He has also taught and advised students and visiting researchers associated with the Field Museum and the University of Illinois Chicago.

Patterson's research concerns the diversification, distribution, evolution, ecology, and conservation of tropical mammals. Much of his work draws on specimens collected during field research in South America and Africa. He has investigated the systematics and biogeography of Neotropical mammals, including rodents, bats, and marsupials, as well as the evolutionary relationships between mammalian hosts and their parasites. His research has contributed to the documentation of mammalian diversity and the understanding of species distributions across tropical regions.

Patterson has authored and co-authored several books on mammalogy, biogeography, and natural history. In 1986, he collaborated with Lawrence R. Heaney on Island Biogeography of Mammals. In 1997, he worked with Steven M. Goodman on Natural Change and Human Impact in Madagascar. His 2004 book, The Lions of Tsavo: Exploring the Legacy of Africa's Notorious Man-Eaters, examined the lions involved in attacks on railway workers during the construction of the Uganda Railway near the Tsavo River in 1898. In 2012, he published Bones, Clones, and Biomes: The History and Geography of Recent Neotropical Mammals.

In 2007, Patterson contributed to Mammals of South America, Volume 1: Marsupials, Xenarthrans, Shrews, and Bats, edited by Alfred L. Gardner. He also authored a chapter on the family shrew opossums in volume 5 of the Handbook of the Mammals of the World in 2015 and a chapter on the naked mole-rat in volume 6 in 2016.

Patterson has participated in the scientific descriptions of numerous mammal species, including the Mann's Andean mouse (Abrothrix manni), Hershkovitz's Andean mouse (Abrothrix hershkovitzi), the Condor shrew opossum (Caenolestes condorensis), the Sangay shrew opossum (Caenolestes sangay), Pearson's long-clawed mouse (Geoxus annectens), Barbara's brush-tailed rat (Isothrix barbarabrownae), Platyrrhinus angustirostris, Platyrrhinus fusciventris, the long-tongued arboreal rat (Rhagomys longilingua), Sturnira bakeri, Sturnira burtonlimi, and Rhinolophus webalai.

== Memberships and editorial work ==
Patterson has been associated with the Committee on Evolutionary Biology at the University of Chicago since 1985. In 1990, he was elected a Fellow of the Linnean Society of London. He served as president of the Society for the Study of Mammalian Evolution from 1996 to 1998. He was vice president of the American Society of Mammalogists from 1999 to 2000 and its president from 2002 to 2004. He has also served as vice president of the American Association of University Professors since 2009.

Patterson has served on the editorial boards of several scientific journals. His editorial appointments included the Journal of Mammalogy from 1991 to 1994, Biodiversity Letters from 1992 to 1997, Mastozoología Neotropical from 1993 to 2002, and the journal's special publications series from 1997 to 2003.

== Awards and eponyms ==
In 1998, zoologist Philip Hershkovitz named the South American rodent genus Brucepattersonius in Patterson's honor.

In 2015, Patterson received the C. Hart Merriam Award from the American Society of Mammalogists in recognition of his outstanding contributions to mammalogical research.

== Selected publications ==
- Heaney, Lawrence R.; Patterson, Bruce D. (1986). Island Biogeography of Mammals.
- Goodman, Steven M.; Patterson, Bruce D. (1997). Natural Change and Human Impact in Madagascar.
- Patterson, Bruce D. (2004). The Lions of Tsavo: Exploring the Legacy of Africa's Notorious Man-Eaters.
- Patterson, Bruce D. (2012). Bones, Clones, and Biomes: The History and Geography of Recent Neotropical Mammals.
