= Four-eyed opossum =

Four-eyed opossum may refer to:

- Brown four-eyed opossum, genus Metachirus
- Gray and black four-eyed opossum, genus Philander
