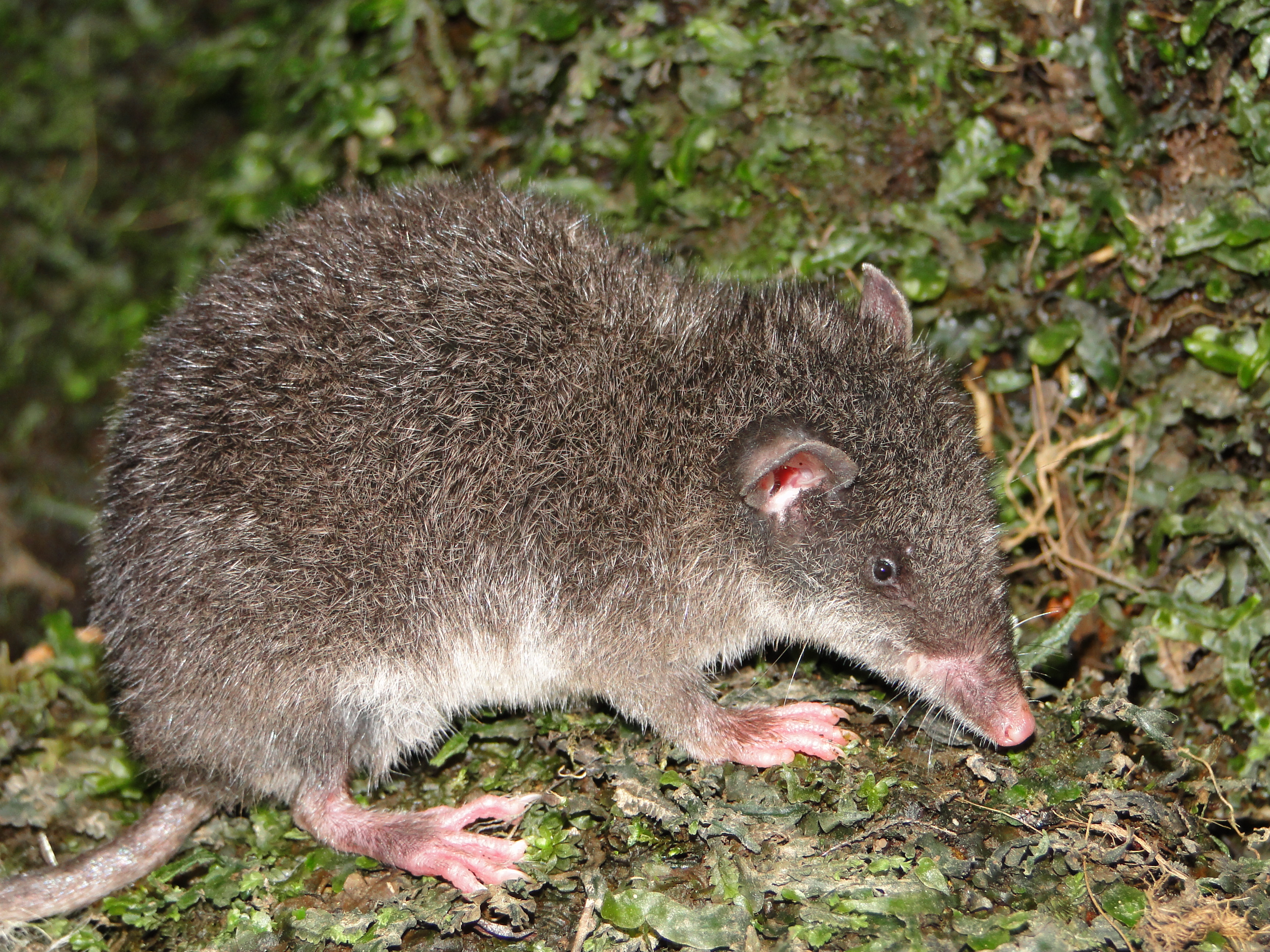
- Holotype, Sangay National Park, Ecuador

Conservation status
- Vulnerable (IUCN 3.1)

Scientific classification
- Kingdom: Animalia
- Phylum: Chordata
- Class: Mammalia
- Infraclass: Marsupialia
- Order: Paucituberculata
- Family: Caenolestidae
- Genus: Caenolestes
- Species: C. sangay

Binomial name
- Caenolestes sangay Ojala-Barbour et al., 2013

= Eastern caenolestid =

Species of marsupial

The eastern caenolestid (Caenolestes sangay) is a shrew opossum found on the eastern slopes of the Andes in southern Ecuador.

== Etymology ==
The origin of the genus name (Caenolestes) drives from the Greek words kainos ("new") and lestes ("robber", "pirate"). The origin of the species name (sangay) derives from Sangay National Park, which is the largest Andean national park in Ecuador. The park itself is named after a volcano called Sangay, one of Ecuador's most active volcanoes that lies within the park. Sangay National Park was the site of the discovery of the eastern caenolestid in 2010.

== Taxonomy ==
The eastern caenolestid is one of the five members of Caenolestes, and is placed in the family Caenolestidae (shrew opossums). In the latter part of 20th century, scientists believed that Caenolestes is closely related to Lestoros (the Incan caenolestid). Over the years, it became clear that Lestoros is morphologically different from Caenolestes. A 2013 morphological and mitochondrial DNA-based phylogenetic study showed that the Incan caenolestid and the long-nosed caenolestid (Rhyncholestes raphanurus) form a clade sister to Caenolestes. The cladogram below is based on this study.

- - - Gray short-tailed opossum (Monodelphis domestica)
    - Brown four-eyed opossum (Metachirus nudicaudatus)
    - - - Incan caenolestid (Lestoros inca)
        - Long-nosed caenolestid (Rhyncholestes raphanurus)
      - Caenolestes
        - Northern caenolestid (C. convelatus)
        - - Dusky caenolestid (C. fuliginosus)
          - - Andean caenolestid (C. condorensis)
            - - Gray-bellied caenolestid (C. caniventer)
              - Eastern caenolestid (C. sangay)

Caenolestid fossils date to as early as the early Eocene (nearly 55 mya).
