= Upano Valley sites =

Network of ancient cities

- Location within Ecuador
- Interactive map of Upano Valley sites
- 2.131751°S 78.105376°W
- Cultures: Kilamope, Upano
- Location: Morona-Santiago Province, Ecuador
- Region: Upano River valley

History
- Built: c. 500 BC
- Abandoned: between 300 AD and 600 AD

Site notes
- Area: 300 km^{2} (120 sq mi)

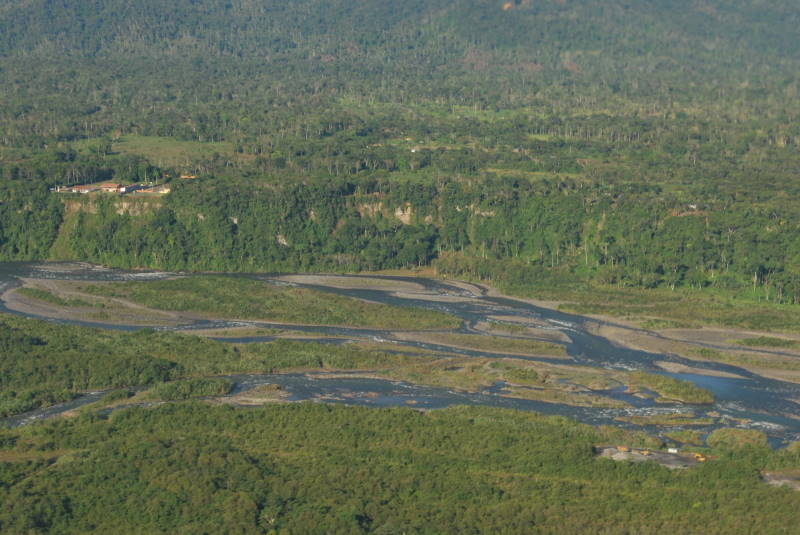
An aerial view of the Upano River valley, relevant to the Upano Valley archaeological sites in eastern Ecuador

The Upano Valley sites are a cluster of archaeological sites in the Amazon rainforest. They are located in the Upano River valley in Morona-Santiago Province in eastern Ecuador. The sites comprise several cities; they are believed to have been inhabited as early as 500 BC, predating any other known complex Amazonian society by over a millennium.

== Excavation history ==
The earliest evidence of premodern settlement in the Upano Valley region was found in the 1970s. Stéphen Rostain, an archaeologist with France's National Center for Scientific Research, began excavations in the region during the 1990s. Exploration of the sites accelerated after the government of Ecuador funded a LIDAR survey of the Upano Valley in 2015, facilitating the discovery of many more settlements than had been previously uncovered. Rostain's team published their findings from the LIDAR survey in Science in January 2024.

== Description of sites ==
The known sites spread across 300 square kilometres (120 square miles) in the Upano River valley. Rostain's team reported the discovery of fifteen settlements, five of which were described as "large settlements"; they especially prioritized the excavation of two settlements known as Kilamope and Sangay. The core area of Kilamope covers an area comparable in size to the Giza Plateau or the main avenue of Teotihuacan. The typical construction pattern at the sites centered around rectangular platforms that had been constructed by excavating and flattening the tops of hills. Around 6,000 of these platforms were discovered, upon which structures were built in groups of three to six. The structures are believed to be primarily residential, though some are thought to have held ceremonial purposes. Hearths and pits were found in the platforms, as well as jars, stones to grind plants, and burned seeds. They measure about 20 metres (66 feet) by 10 metres (33 feet) and are 2–3 metres (6.6–9.8 feet) high. One complex at Kilamope had a platform that measures 140 metres (460 feet) by 40 metres (130 feet). A system of roads, extending as far as 25 kilometres (16 miles), connected the valley's residential areas. Ditches and road obstructions were observed around some of the settlements, suggesting that they might have needed to defend against threats.

The urbanized areas of the Upano Valley sites were found to be surrounded by agricultural land, including fields and hillside terraces, that grew crops such as corn, manioc, and sweet potato. These agricultural lands were bounded by a network of drainage ditches and canals. Rostain speculates that the nearby Sangay volcano provided the region with rich soil for cultivation.

The Upano Valley sites were first inhabited around 500 BC, and are believed to have been abandoned between 300 AD and 600 AD. Rostain theorizes that the decline of the sites may be linked to eruptions of the Sangay volcano. The population of the region is debated; Antoine Dorison, a co-author on the Science paper, estimates that the cluster's population peaked at around 15,000 to 30,000 people, while a BBC News article reported that other estimates of the region's population exceeded 100,000.

Archaeologists have labeled the inhabitants of the sites as members of the Kilamope and Upano cultures. The society and cultural practices of these groups are still little understood. Material culture that has been found at the sites includes painted pottery, as well as jugs containing the residue of chicha, a maize-based alcoholic drink common in pre-Columbian South America.

== See also ==
- Llanos de Moxos
- Lost city
- Lost City of Z
- El Dorado
