= Bardalestes =

Bardalestes Temporal range: Thanetian–Lutetian

Scientific classification
- Kingdom: Animalia
- Phylum: Chordata
- Class: Mammalia
- Infraclass: Marsupialia
- Order: Paucituberculata
- Genus: †Bardalestes
- Species: †B. hunco

Binomial name
- †Bardalestes hunco Goin et al., 2009

Extinct genus of paucituberculate mammal

Bardalestes is an extinct monotypic genus of paucituberculate mammal that lived during the Palaeocene and Eocene epochs.

== Etymology ==
The generic name Bardalestes is derived from the site of La Barda, where fossils of the genus that included the type specimen were found, and the Latin word lestes, meaning "thief" or "pirate".
