= Pitheculites =

Pitheculites Temporal range: Miocene

Scientific classification
- Kingdom: Animalia
- Phylum: Chordata
- Class: Mammalia
- Infraclass: Marsupialia
- Order: Paucituberculata
- Family: †Abderitidae
- Genus: †Pitheculites; Ameghino, 1901

Type species
- Pitheculites minimus Ameghino, 1902

Other species
- Pitheculites chenche Dumont and Bown, 1987 Pitheculites ipururensis Stutz et al., 2022 Pitheculites rothi Marshall, 1990

Extinct genus of abderitid metatherian

Pitheculites is an extinct genus of abderitid metatherian that lived in South America during the Miocene epoch.

== Desciption ==
Pitheculites ipururensis possessed a wider hypoconulid shelf on the M_{2} and a longer cristid posterior to the metaconid compared to any other member of Pitheculites. Pitheculites rothi had a more quadrangular and broader M_{2} relative to P. ipururensis. Like Pitheculites chenche, P. ipururensis had a cuspid-like entocristid on the M_{1}, distinguishing it from Pitheculites minimus, whose M_{1} had a crestid-like entocristid. P. ipururensis differed from P. chenche because its had a crestid-like postentocristid in M_{1}.
