= Upano River =

River in Ecuador

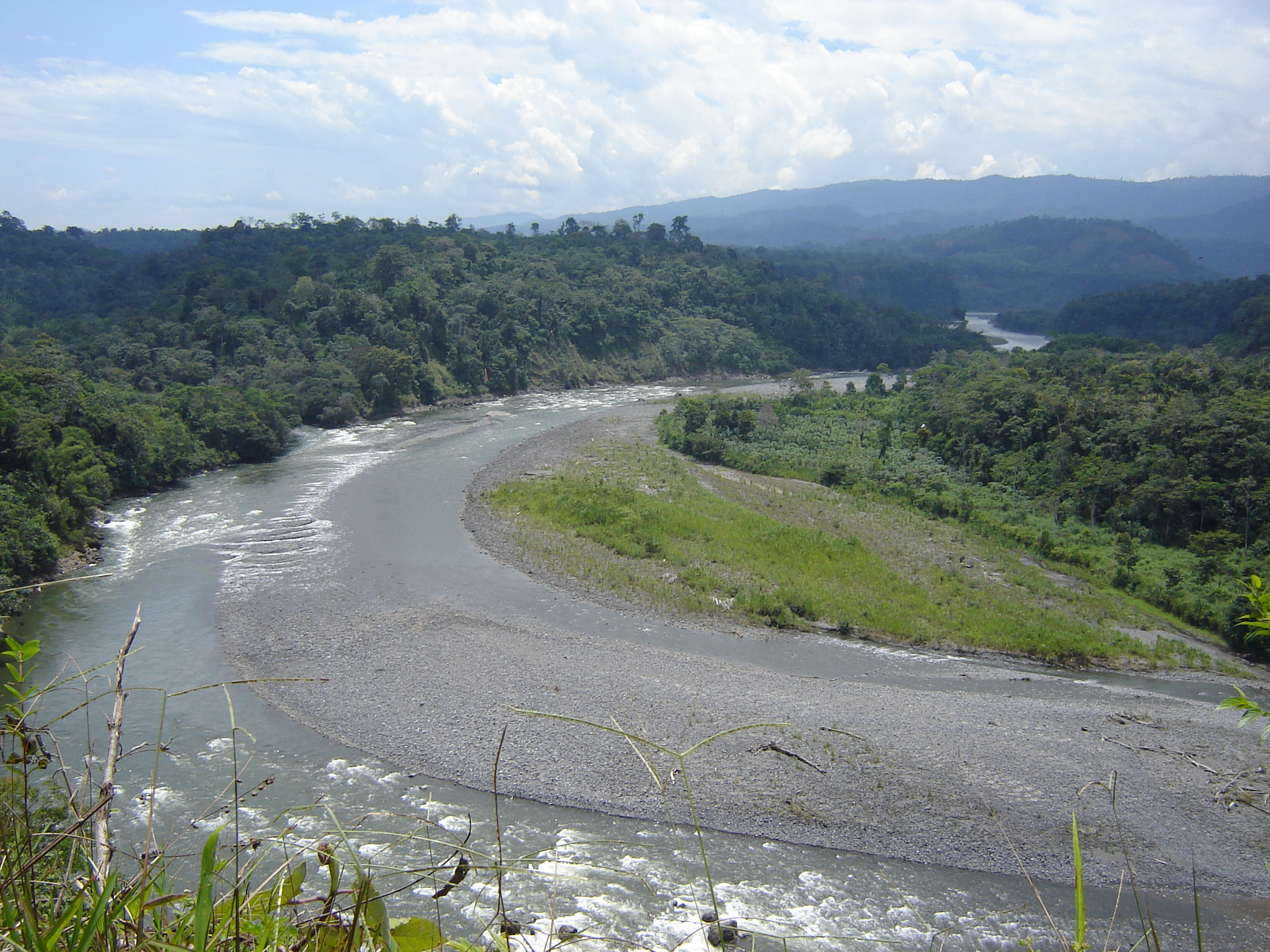
- Upano River, Logrono

Location
- Country: Ecuador

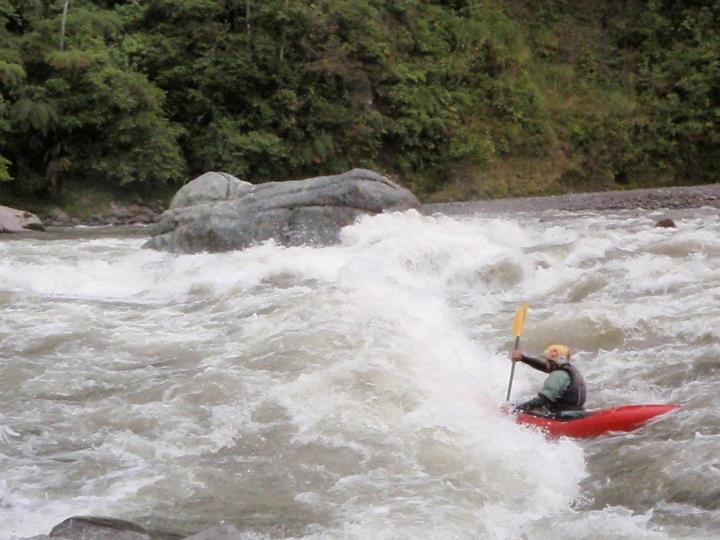
Kayak in Rio Upano, Sucua

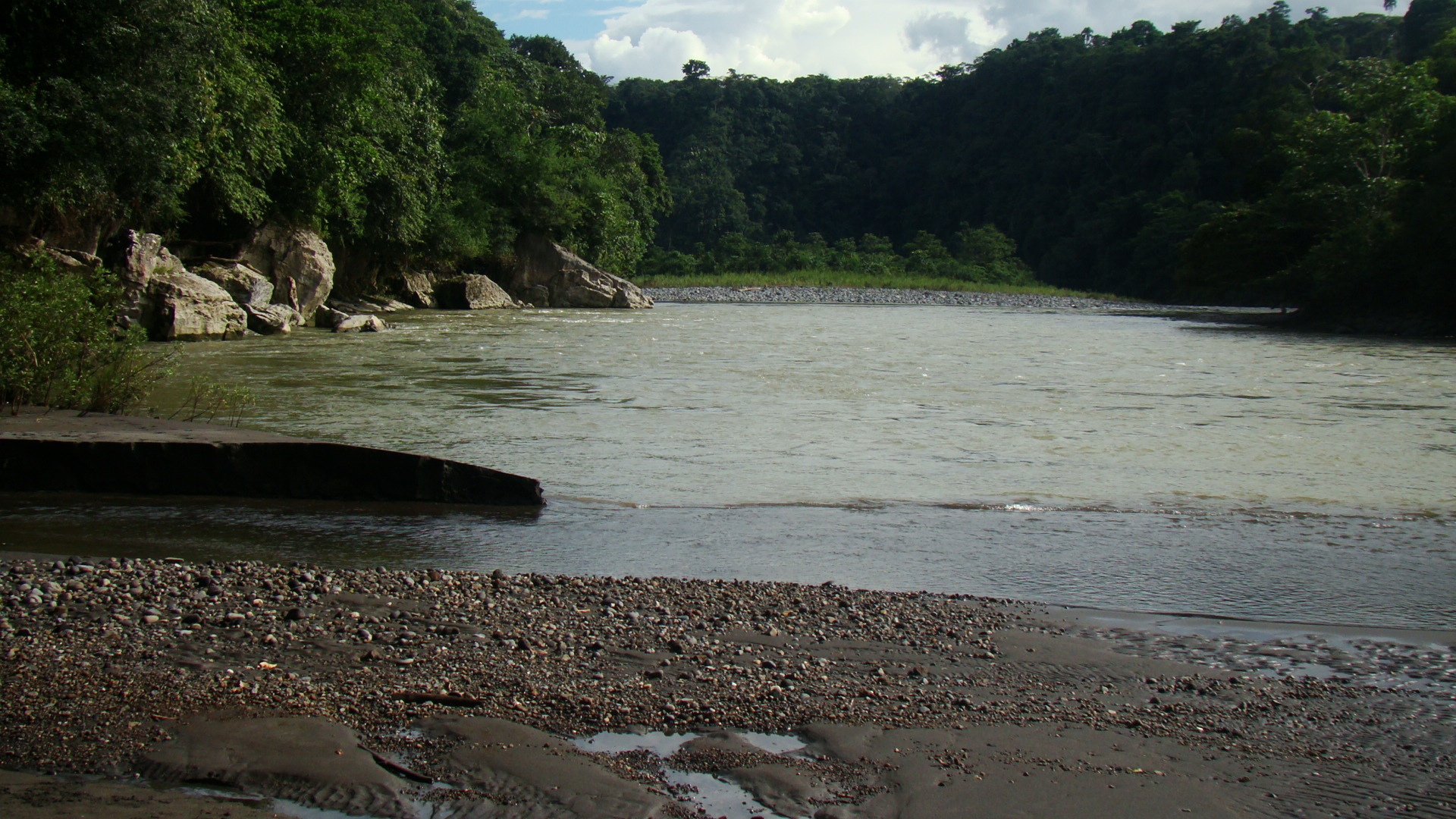
Beach by Caverna de las Cascadas

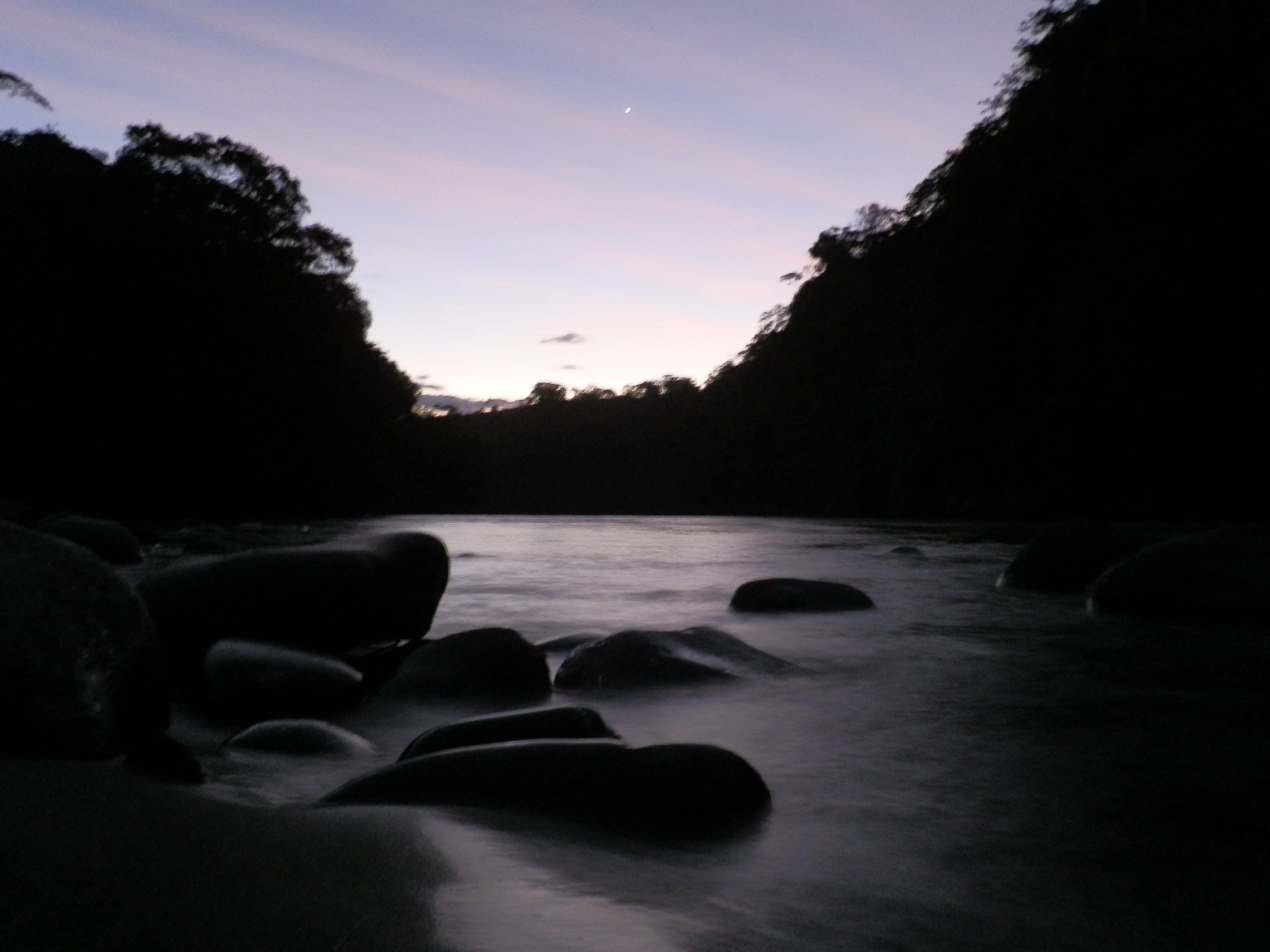
Hot water springs by the Rio Upano, Logrono

The Upano River is a river of Ecuador. This river runs from the sierra to the depths of the Amazon. The river is mainly used locally for fishing, there is also rafting and kayaking offered out of Macas (class III-V). The Rio Upano is known for its fossils, sandy beaches and many hot springs. There are numerous river overlooks including one a block from the central park of Logroño. There is also a cable car that crosses the river outside of Logroño across from Shuar Community ("La Union").

== History ==
The Upano Valley is home to oldest currently-known urban settlements in the Amazon. Archaeological digs and LIDAR surveys published in 2024 revealed a complex network of roads connecting densely populated areas dating back to at least 500 BCE and occupied as late as 600 CE.

== See also ==
- List of rivers of Ecuador
