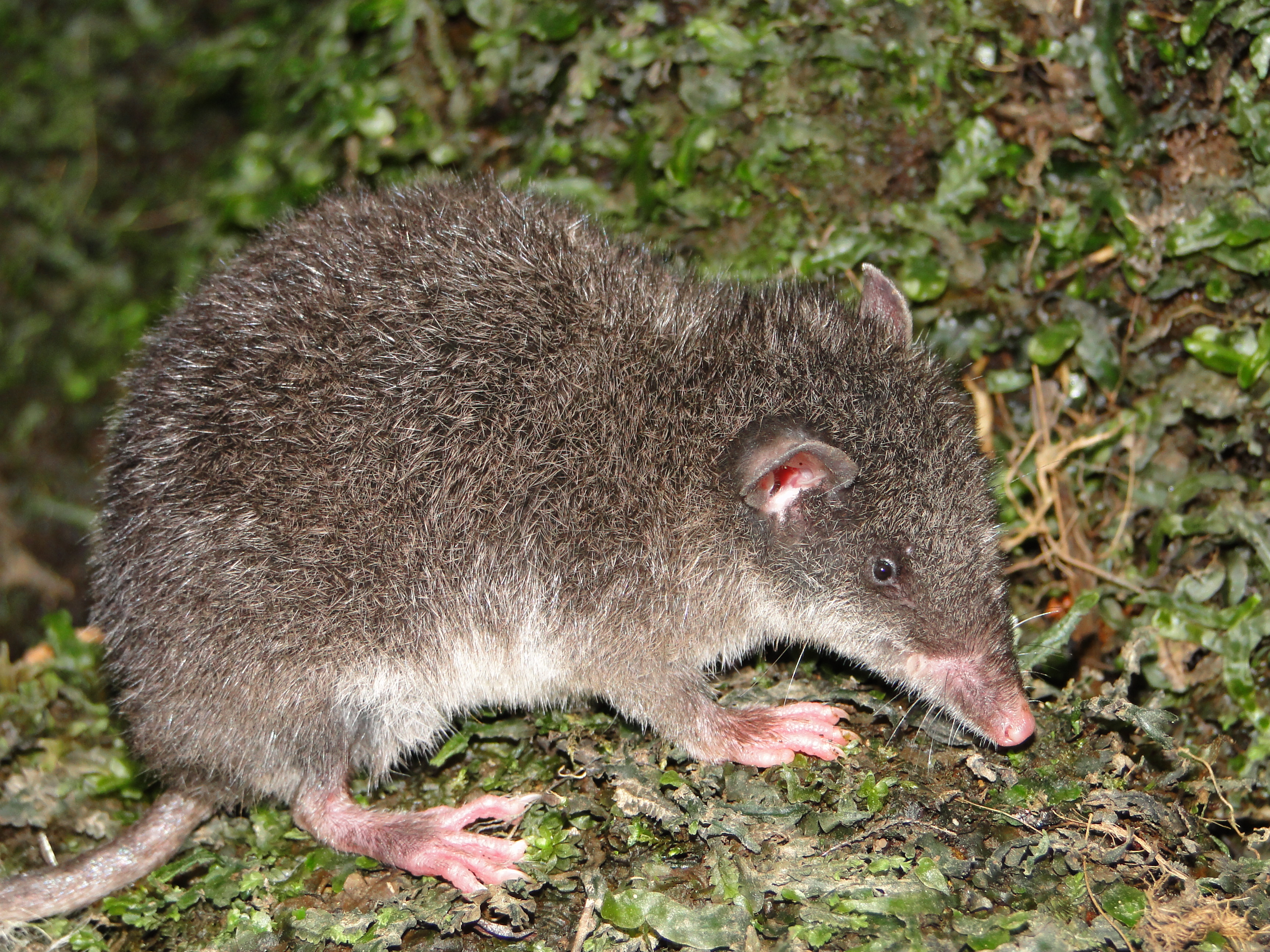
- C. sangay

Scientific classification
- Kingdom: Animalia
- Phylum: Chordata
- Class: Mammalia
- Infraclass: Marsupialia
- Order: Paucituberculata
- Family: Caenolestidae
- Genus: Caenolestes; Thomas, 1895

Type species
- Hyracodon fuliginosus Tomes, 1863

Species
- C. caniventer; C. condorensis; C. convelatus; C. fuliginosus; C. sangay
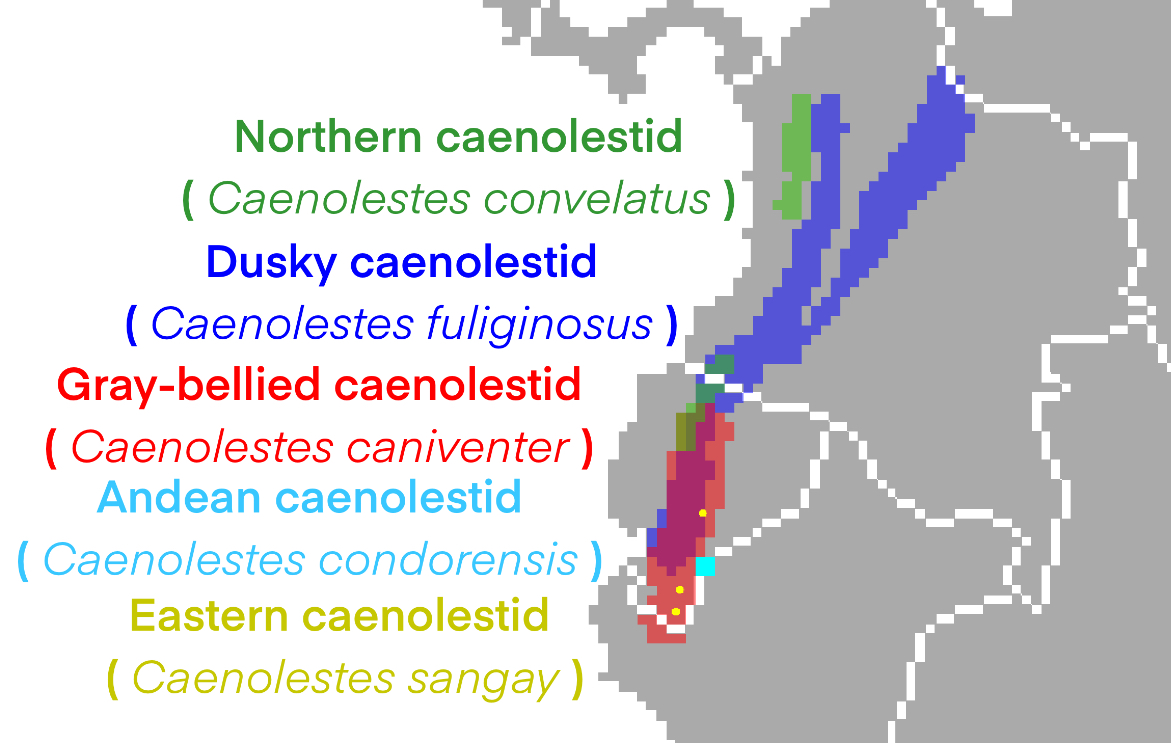

Synonyms
- Hyracodon Tomes 1863 non Leidy 1856; Coenolestes O. Thomas 1895 [orth. error]

= Caenolestes =

Common shrew opossums

Genus of marsupials

The common shrew opossums (genus Caenolestes) are members of the family Caenolestidae. They are found in Colombia, Ecuador, Peru, and Venezuela. The most recently discovered species is C. sangay.

== Phylogeny ==
Phylogeny of Caenolestes

- Caenolestes
  - C. fuliginosus (Tomes 1863) (Dusky shrew opossum)
  - - C. convelatus Anthony 1924 (Northern shrew opossum)
    - - C. sangay Oajala-Barbour et al. 2013 (Eastern shrew opossum)
      - - C. caniventer Anthony 1921 (Gray-bellied shrew opossum)
        - C. condorensis Albuja & Patterson 1996 (Andean shrew opossum)

== See also ==
- List of mammal genera
- List of recently extinct mammals
- List of prehistoric mammals
