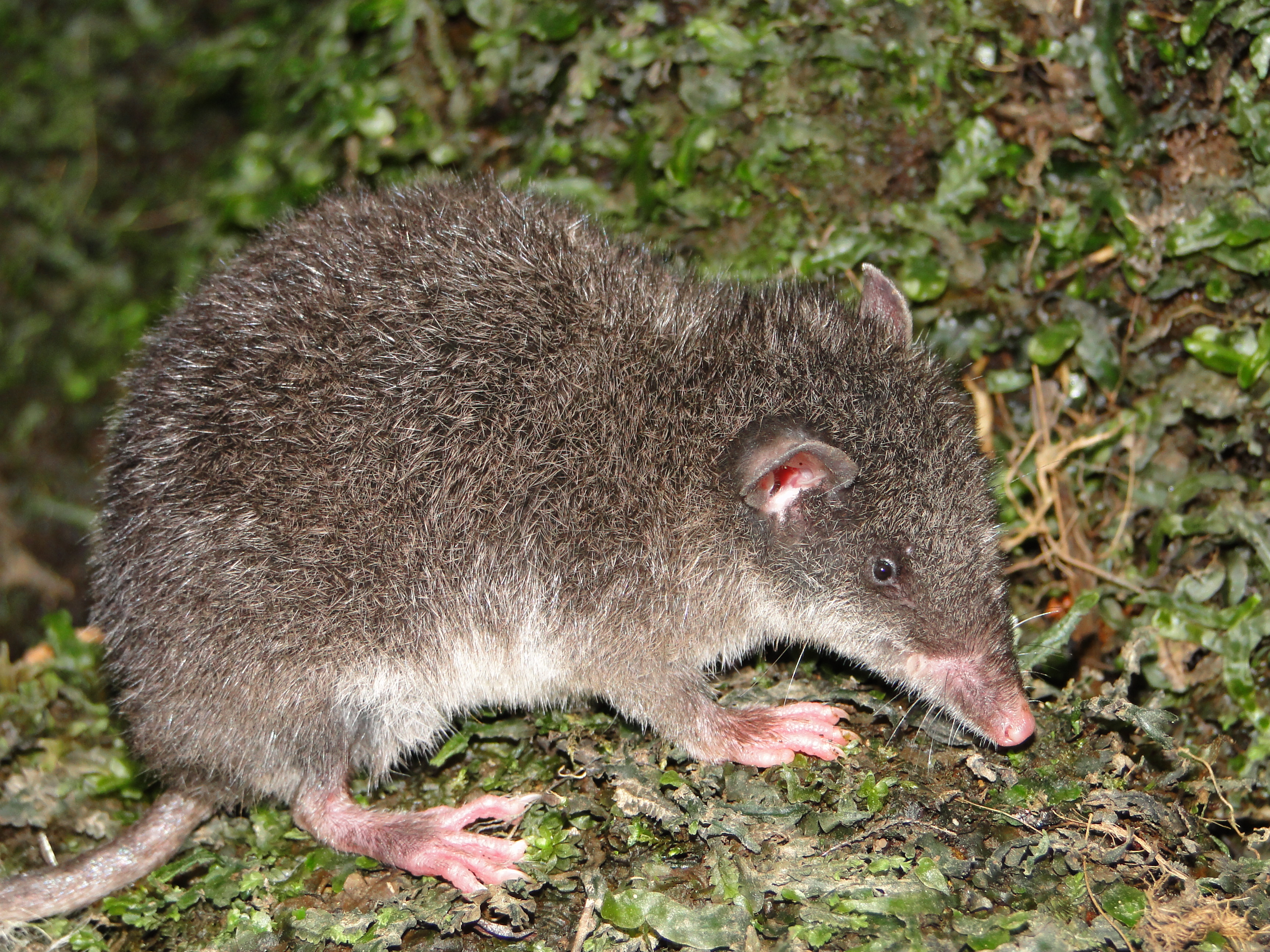
- Caenolestes sangay

Scientific classification
- Kingdom: Animalia
- Phylum: Chordata
- Class: Mammalia
- Infraclass: Marsupialia
- Order: Paucituberculata
- Family: Caenolestidae; Trouessart, 1898

Type genus
- Caenolestes Thomas, 1895

Genera
- Caenolestes; †Caenolestoides; †Gaimanlestes; Lestoros; † Pliolestes; † Progarzonia; † Pseudhalmarhiphus; Rhyncholestes; † Stilotherium
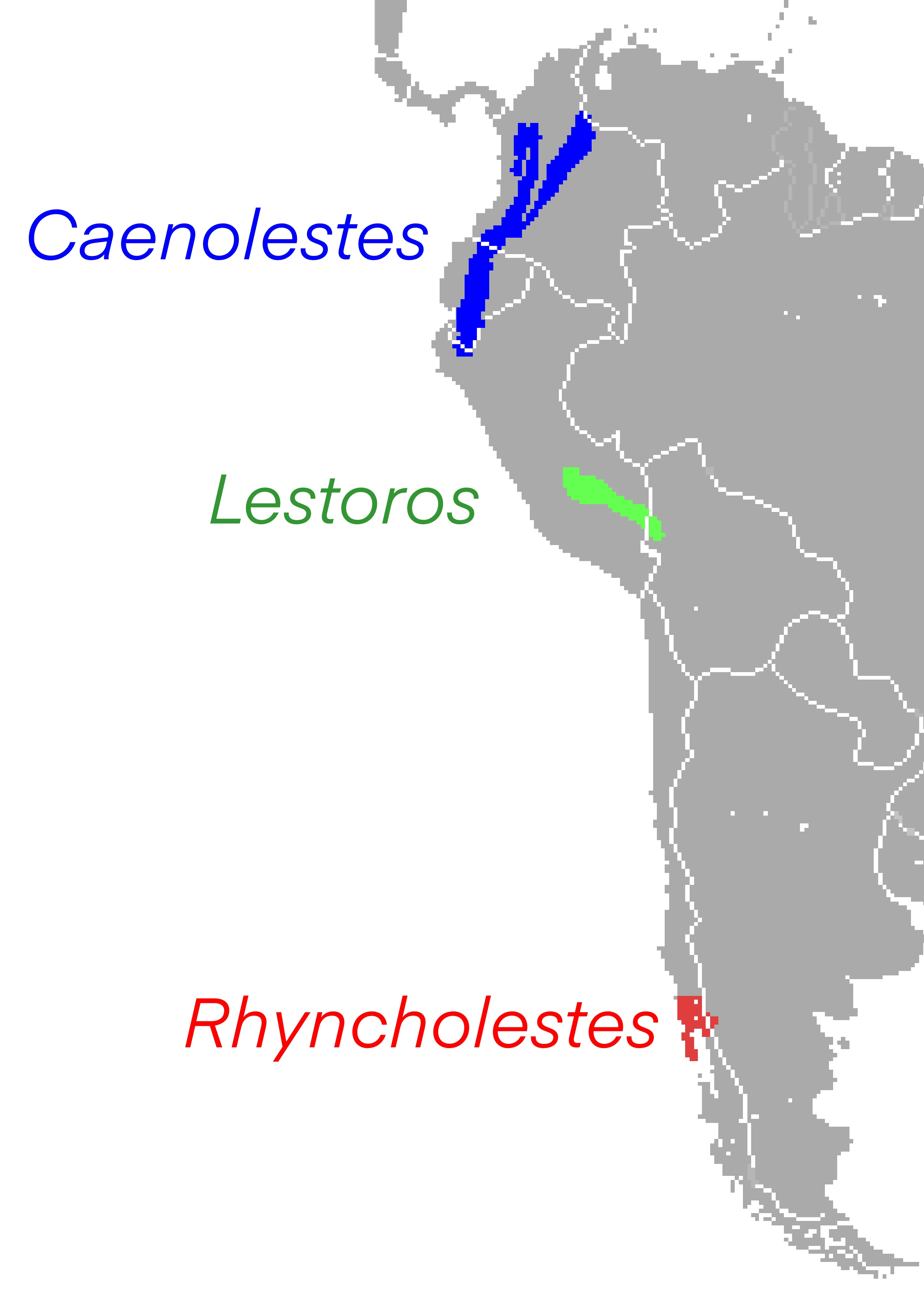

Synonyms
- Caenolestinae Sinclair 1906; Garzoniidae Ameghino 1890

= Shrew opossum =

Shrew opossums Temporal range: Priabonian-Recent ~37.2–0 Ma

Family of marsupials

The family Caenolestidae contains the seven surviving species of shrew opossum: small, shrew-like marsupials that are confined to the Andes mountains of South America. The order is thought to have diverged from the ancestral marsupial line very early. They were once included in the superorder but it is now known that Ameridelphia is paraphyletic, having given rise to Australidelphia, and thus could be considered an evolutionary grade. Genetic studies indicate that they are sister to other marsupials, excluding the didelphimorphs. As recently as 20 million years ago, at least seven genera were in South America. Today, just three genera remain. They live in inaccessible forest and grassland regions of the High Andes.

Shrews were entirely absent from South America until the Great American Interchange three million years ago, and are currently present only in the northwestern part of the continent. Traditionally, it was thought that shrew opossums lost ground to these and other placental invaders that fill the same ecological niches. Evidence suggests, however, that both groups not only overlap, but do not seem to be in direct competition, and the marsupials' larger size seems to imply that they prey on shrews and rodents. Several opossums, such as Monodelphis, also occupy small insectivore niches.

Shrew opossums (also known as rat opossums or caenolestids) are about the size of a small rat (9–14 cm long), with thin limbs, a long, pointed snout and a slender, hairy tail. They are largely carnivorous, being active hunters of insects, earthworms, and small vertebrates. They have small eyes and poor sight, and hunt in the early evening and at night, using their hearing and long, sensitive whiskers to locate prey. They seem to spend much of their lives in burrows and on surface runways. Like several other marsupials, they do not have a pouch, and it appears that females do not carry the young constantly, possibly leaving them in the burrow.

Largely because of their rugged, inaccessible habitat, they are very poorly known and have traditionally been considered rare. Several ecological factors, including density of forest, contribute to the part of the forests the shrew opossums occupy. Recent studies suggest they may be more common than had been thought. Their karyotype has also been described through contemporary research in order to better understand this organism.

== Classification ==
Cladogram of living Caenolestidae

- - - Lestoros inca
    - Rhyncholestes raphanurus
  - Caenolestes
    - C. fuliginosus
    - - C. convelatus
      - - C. sangay
        - - C. caniventer
          - C. condorensis

Cladogram of extinct Caenolestidae

- - †Stilotherium
  - - †Gaimanlestes
    - - †Pliolestes
      - - †Caenolestoides
        - - - Lestoros
            - Rhyncholestes
          - Caenolestes

- Genus Caenolestes Thomas 1895
  - C. caniventer (Gray-bellied caenolestid)
  - C. condorensis (Andean caenolestid)
  - C. convelatus (Northern caenolestid)
  - C. fuliginosus (Dusky caenolestid)
  - C. sangay (Eastern caenolestid)
- Genus †Caenolestoides Arbello, Martin & Cardoso 2021
  - †C. miocaenicus Arbello, Martin & Cardoso 2021
- Genus †Gaimanlestes Arbello, Martin & Cardoso 2021
  - †G. pascuali Arbello, Martin & Cardoso 2021
- Genus Lestoros Oehser 1934
  - L. inca (Peruvian or Incan caenolestid)
- Genus †Pliolestes Reig 1955
  - †P. tripotamicus Reig 1955
  - †P. venetus Goin, Montalvo & Visconti 2000
- Genus †Pseudhalmarhiphus Ameghino 1903
  - †P. guaraniticus (Ameghino 1899) Ameghino 1903
- Genus Rhyncholestes Osgood 1924
  - R. raphanurus (Long-nosed caenolestid)
- Genus †Stilotherium Ameghino 1887
  - †S. parvum Arbello, Martin & Cardoso 2021
  - †S. dissimile Ameghino 1887

However, Bublitz suggested in 1987 there were actually two Lestoros and Rhyncholestes species (those listed here plus L. gracilis and R. continentalis). This is, however, not accepted by most scientists.

== Fossils ==
Spatio-temporal locations of fossil species:

=== Paleogene ===
Eocene

- Perulestes - Pozo Formation, Peru

Barrancan

- Progarzonia notostylopense - Sarmiento Formation, Argentina

Deseadan

- Pseudhalmarhiphus guaraniticus - Sarmiento Formation, Argentina

=== Neogene ===
Colhuehuapian

- Pebas Formation, Amazon Basin
- Caenolestoides miocaenicus - Sarmiento Formation, Colhue-Huapi Member
- Gaimanlestes pascuali - Sarmiento Formation, Trelew Member
- Stilotherium parvum - Sarmiento Formation, Colhue-Huapi Member

Laventan

- Honda Group, Bolivia

Huayquerian

- Pliolestes venetus - Cerro Azul Formation, Argentina

Pliocene

- Umala Formation, Bolivia

Montehermosan

- Pliolestes tripotamicus - Argentina

== See also ==
- List of mammal genera
- List of prehistoric mammals
