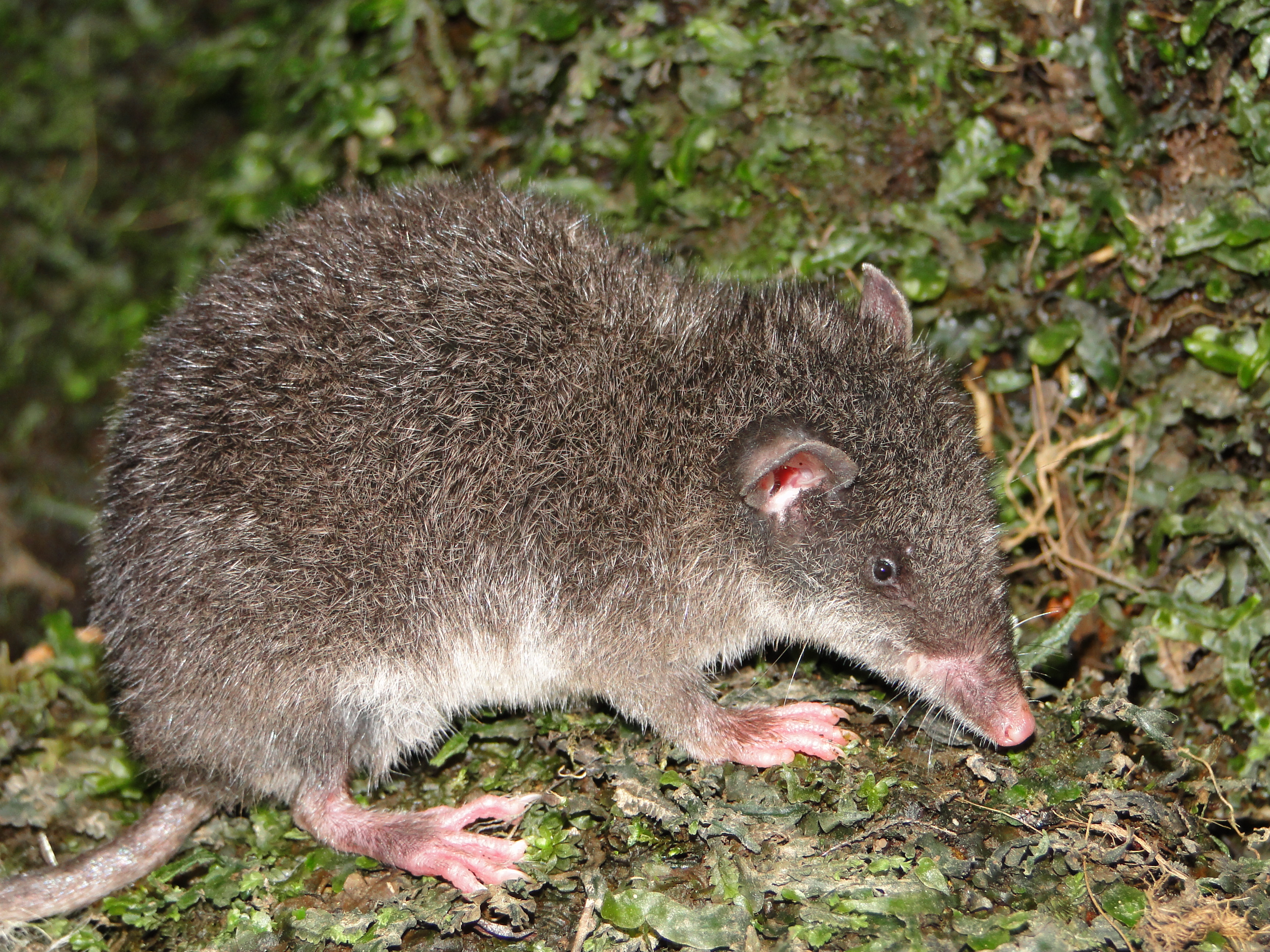
- Caenolestes sangay

Scientific classification
- Kingdom: Animalia
- Phylum: Chordata
- Class: Mammalia
- Clade: Marsupialiformes
- Infraclass: Marsupialia
- Order: Paucituberculata; Ameghino, 1894

Suborders
- See text

Diversity
- 7 extant species

Synonyms
- Paucituberculiformes Kinman 1994; Asyndactylia Thomas 1895

= Paucituberculata =

Paucituberculata Temporal range: Late Paleocene (Itaboraian)-Recent ~58.7–0 Ma

Order of marsupials

Paucituberculata /ˌpɔːsɪtjuːˌbɜːrkjuːˈleɪtə/ is an order of South American marsupials. Although currently represented only by the seven living species of shrew opossums, this order was formerly much more diverse, with more than 60 extinct species named from the fossil record, particularly from the late Oligocene to early Miocene epochs. The earliest paucituberculatans date to the late Paleocene (Itaboraian South American land mammal age). The group went through a pronounced decline in the middle Miocene epoch, which resulted in the extinction of all families of this order except for the living shrew opossums (Caenolestidae). Extinct families of Paucituberculatans include Pichipilidae, Palaeothentidae, and Abderitidae.

== Classification ==
It is one of two clades of Ameridelphia, a paraphyletic group; genetic studies have shown these animals to be a sister group to Australidelphia (i.e., Didelphimorphia branched off first). However, other studies have shown that shrew opossums branched off first, and thus Didelphimorphia is the sister group of Australidelphia.

The Paucituberculata were once considered to be closely related to South American polydolopimorph metatherians, however phylogenetic analyses have found this is not true.

=== Subdivision ===
The order is subdivided into:

Phylogeny of Paucituberculata

- - †Bardalestes
  - - †Fieratherium
    - - †Evolestes
      - - Caenolestidae
          - †Stilotherium
          - - †Gaimanlestes
            - - †Pliolestes
              - - †Caenolestoides
                - - - Lestoros
                    - Rhyncholestes
                  - Caenolestes
        - †Palaeothentoidea
          - - †Pichipilidae
              - †Phonocdromus
              - †Pichipilus
          - - †Perulestes
            - - †Sasawatsu
              - - - †Palaeothentes boliviensis
                  - †Pilchenia
                - - †Abderitidae
                    - †Parabderites
                    - - †Pitheculites
                      - †Abderites
                  - †Palaeothentidae
                    - - †Trelewthentes
                      - - †Titanothentes
                        - †Acdestis
                    - - - †Carlothentes
                        - †Antawallathentes
                      - - †Palaepanorthus
                        - †Palaeothentes

- †Bardalestes Goin et al. 2009
- †Evolestes Goin et al. 2007
- †Fieratherium Forasiepi et al. 2013
- †Riolestes Goin et al. 2009
- Superfamily Caenolestoidea Trouessart 1898
  - Family Caenolestidae Trouessart 1898
    - Caenolestes Thomas 1895
    - †Caenolestoides Arbello, Martin & Cardoso 2021
    - †Gaimanlestes Arbello, Martin & Cardoso 2021
    - Lestoros Oehser 1934
    - †Pliolestes Reig 1955
    - †Pseudhalmarhiphus Ameghino 1903
    - Rhyncholestes Osgood 1924
    - †Stilotherium Ameghino 1887
- Superfamily †Palaeothentoidea Goin et al. 2009
  - †Perulestes Goin & Candela 2004
  - †Pilchenia Ameghino 1903
  - †Sasawatsu Goin & Candela 2004
  - Family †Pichipilidae Marshall 1980
    - †Phonocdromus Ameghino 1894
    - †Pichipilus Ameghino 1890
    - †Quirogalestes Goin & Candela 1998
  - Family †Abderitidae Ameghino 1889
    - †Abderites Ameghino 1887
    - †Parabderites Ameghino 1902
    - †Pitheculites Ameghino 1902
  - Family †Palaeothentidae Sinclair 1906
    - †Chimeralestes Engelman et al. 2017
    - †Hondathentes Dumont & Brown 1997
    - Subfamily †Palaeothentinae Sinclair 1906
      - †Antawallathentes Rincón et al. 2015
      - †Carlothentes Bown & Fleagle 1993
      - †Palaeothentes Ameghino 1887
      - †Palaepanorthus Ameghino 1902
      - †Propalaeothentes Bown & Fleagle 1993
    - Subfamily †Acdestinae Bown & Fleagle 1993
      - †Acdestis Ameghino 1887
      - †Acdestoides Bown & Fleagle 1993
      - †Acdestodon Bown & Fleagle 1993
      - †Titanothentes Rae, Bown & Fleagle 1996
      - †Trelewthentes Bown & Fleagle 1993

== See also ==
- List of mammal genera
- List of prehistoric mammals
