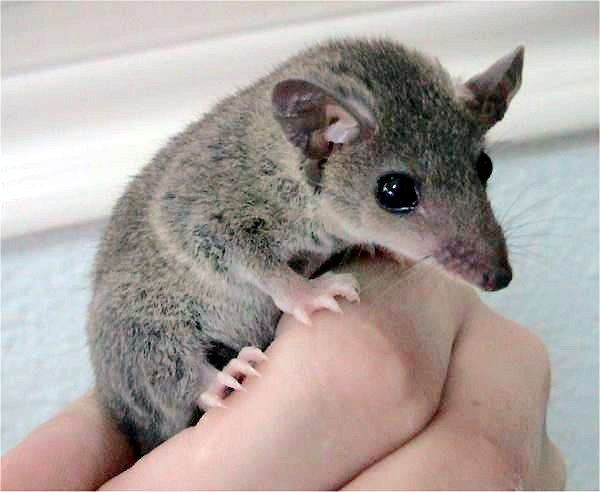

Conservation status
- Least Concern (IUCN 3.1)

Scientific classification
- Kingdom: Animalia
- Phylum: Chordata
- Class: Mammalia
- Infraclass: Marsupialia
- Order: Didelphimorphia
- Family: Didelphidae
- Genus: Monodelphis
- Species: M. domestica

Binomial name
- Monodelphis domestica (Wagner, 1842)
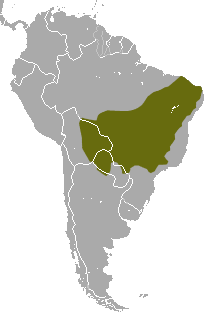
- Gray short-tailed opossum range

Synonyms
- Didelphys domestica

= Gray short-tailed opossum =

Species of marsupial

The gray short-tailed opossum (Monodelphis domestica) is a small South American member of the family Didelphidae. Unlike most other marsupials, the gray short-tailed opossum does not have a true pouch. The scientific name Monodelphis is derived from Greek and means "single womb" (referring to the lack of a pouch) and the Latin word domestica which means "domestic" (chosen because of the species' habit of entering human dwellings). It was the first marsupial to have its genome sequenced. The gray short-tailed opossum is used as a research model in science, and is also frequently found in the exotic pet trade. It is also known as the Brazilian opossum, rainforest opossum and in a research setting the laboratory opossum.

== Description ==
Gray short-tailed opossums are relatively small animals, with a superficial resemblance to voles. In the wild they have head-body length of 12 to 18 cm (4.7 to 7.1 in) and weigh 58 to 95 grams (2.0 to 3.4 oz); males are larger than females. However, individuals kept in captivity are typically much larger, with males weighing up to 150 grams (5.3 oz). As the common name implies, the tail is proportionately shorter than in some other opossum species, ranging from 5 to 9 centimetres (2.0 to 3.5 in). Their tails are only semi-prehensile, unlike the fully prehensile tail characteristic of the North American opossum.

The fur is greyish brown over almost the entire body, although fading to a paler shade on the underparts, and with near-white fur on the feet. Only the base of the tail has fur, the remainder being almost entirely hairless. The claws are well-developed and curved in shape, and the paws have small pads marked with fine dermal ridges. Unlike many other marsupials, females do not have a pouch. They typically possess thirteen teats, which can be retracted into the body by muscles at their base.

== Distribution and habitat ==
The gray short-tailed opossum is found generally south of the Amazon River, in southern, central, and western Brazil. It is also found in eastern Bolivia, northern Paraguay, and in Formosa Province in northern Argentina. It inhabits rainforest environments, scrubland, and agricultural land, and often enters man-made structures, such as houses. There are no recognised subspecies.

== Behaviour ==
Gray short-tailed opossums eat rodents, frogs, reptiles, and invertebrates, as well as some fruit. They hunt primarily by scent, poking their snout into vegetation in search of prey or dead animals to scavenge. Once they find living prey, they pounce onto it, holding it down with their forefeet while delivering a killing strike, often to the base of the neck, with their sharp teeth. They can successfully take prey up to their own size.

They are nocturnal, being most active in the first three hours after dusk. Although they may occasionally shelter in natural crevices in the rock, they normally spend the day in concealed nests constructed of leaves, bark, and other available materials. The nests of females are more complex and tightly woven than those of males. They are solitary, coming together only to mate, and with each individual occupying a home range of 1,200 to 1,800 m^{2} (13,000 to 19,000 sq ft), flagged with scent marks. The approach of another member of the species is commonly met with hissing and screeching, which may escalate to defensive strikes launched while the animal is standing on its hind legs.

== Reproduction ==
The opossums breed year round when the climate is suitable, being able to raise up to six litters of six to eleven young each during a good year. Females only come into oestrus when exposed to male pheromones, with ovulation being induced only by physical contact with the male. Gestation lasts fourteen days, after which the young attach to a teat, where they remain for the next two weeks. Like all marsupials, the young are born undeveloped; in this species they are just 1 centimetre (0.39 in) in length and weigh 0.1 grams (0.0035 oz) at birth. The young grow hair at around three weeks, open their eyes about a week later, and are weaned at eight weeks

Gray short-tailed opossums are sexually mature at five to six months of age, and live for up to forty-nine months in captivity.

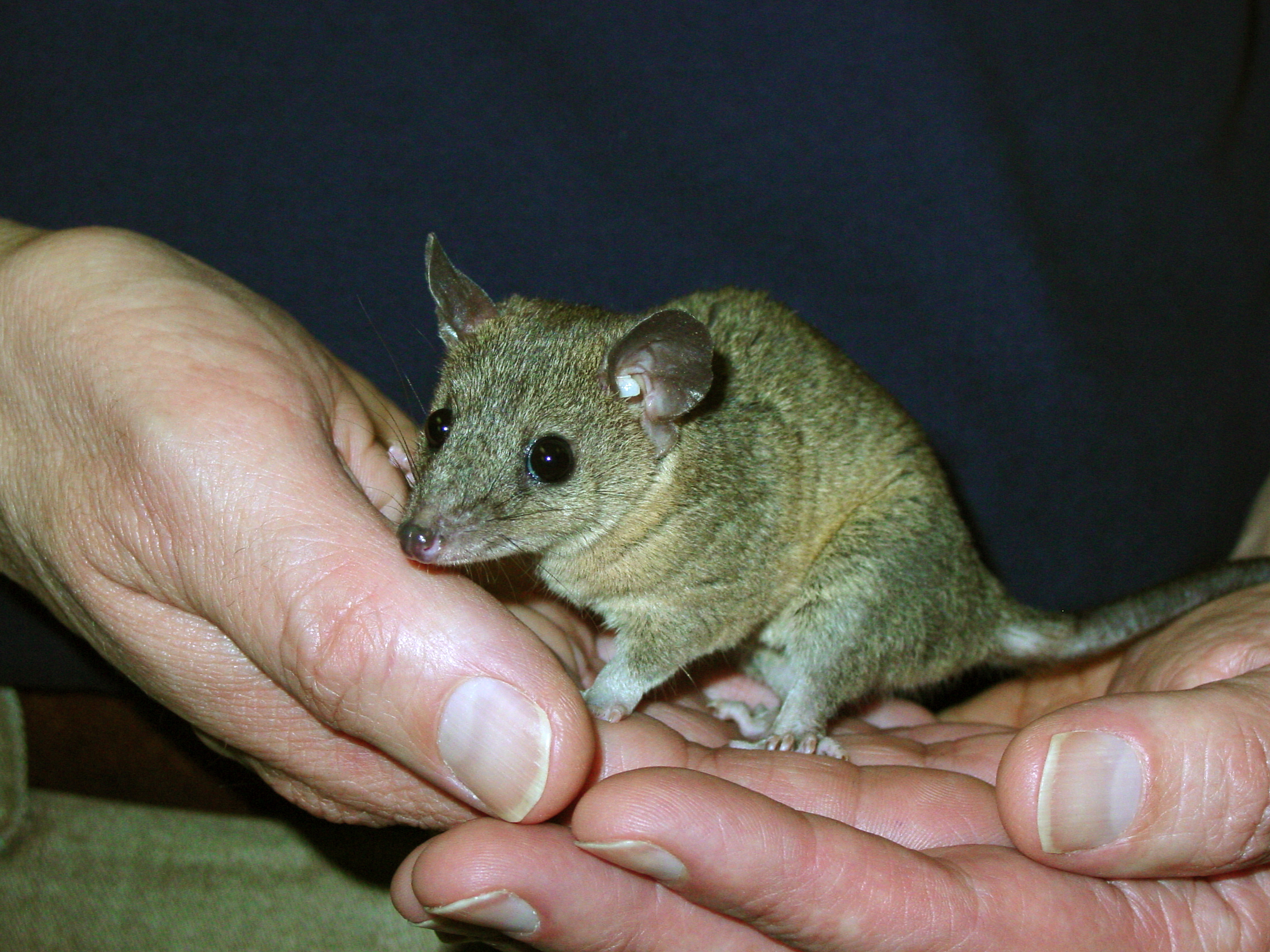
Monodelphis domestica

== Laboratory opossum ==
The gray short-tailed opossum possesses several features that make it an ideal research model, particularly in studies of marsupials, as well as the immunological and developmental research on mammalian systems. It breeds relatively easily in laboratory settings, and neonates are exposed and can be readily accessed because, unlike other marsupial species, female opossums lack a pouch: neonates simply cling to the teats. Opossums are born at a stage that is approximately equivalent to 13- to 15-day-old fetal rats or 40-day-old human embryos. Like other marsupials, the inadequacies of the neonate's immune system function make it an ideal model for both transplant and cancer research, as well as general investigations into immune system development and its similarities to other eutherian mammals. Its genome was sequenced and a working draft published in May 2007: the decoding work, directed by MIT and Harvard, reveals the opossum to have between 18,000 and 20,000 protein-coding genes. The full genome sequence and annotation can be found on the Ensembl Genome Browser.
