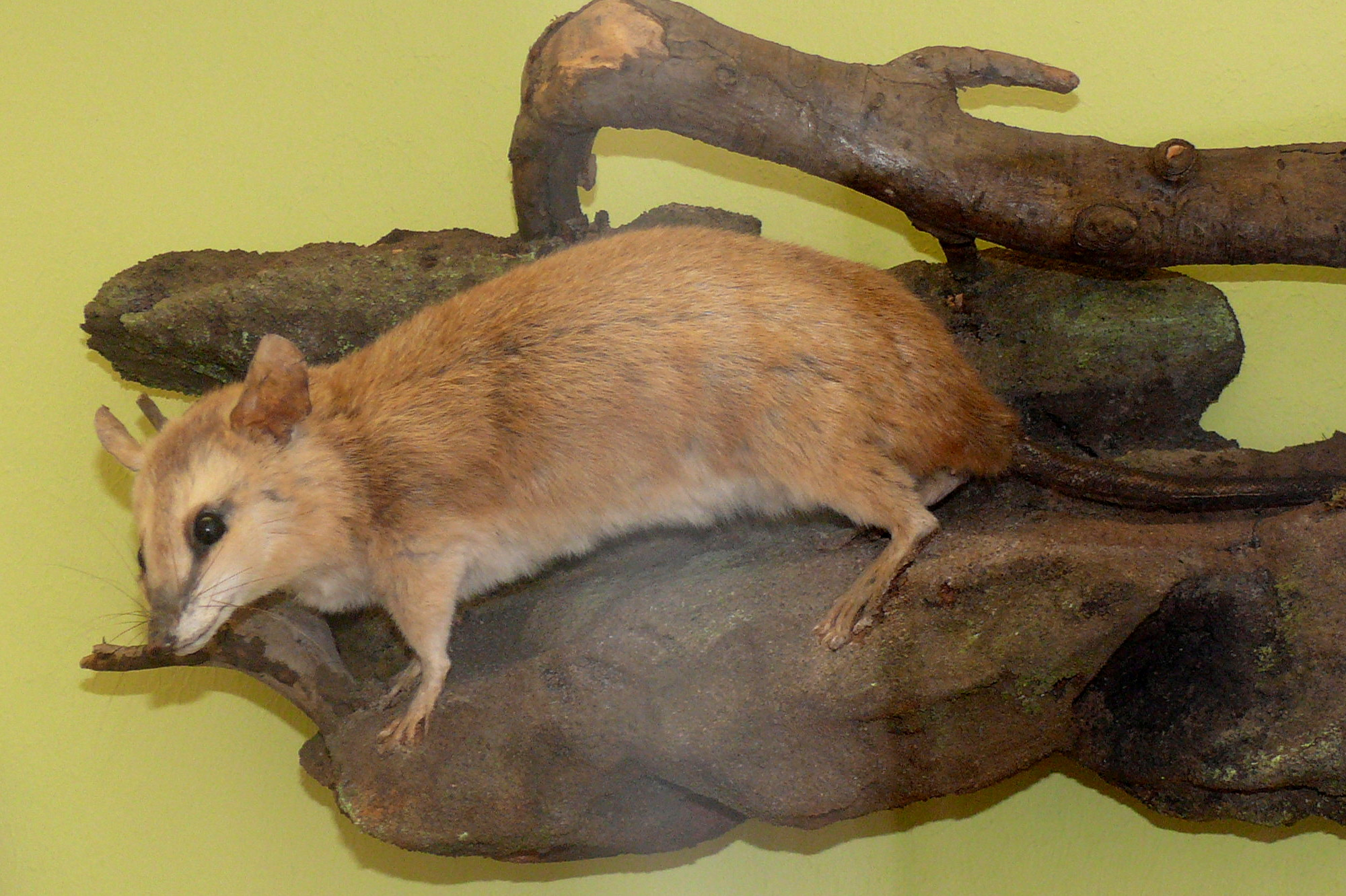

Conservation status
- Least Concern (IUCN 3.1)

Scientific classification
- Kingdom: Animalia
- Phylum: Chordata
- Class: Mammalia
- Infraclass: Marsupialia
- Order: Didelphimorphia
- Family: Didelphidae
- Subfamily: Didelphinae
- Tribe: Metachirini; Reig et al., 1987
- Genus: Metachirus; Burmeister, 1854
- Species: M. nudicaudatus

Binomial name
- Metachirus nudicaudatus (É. Geoffroy, 1803)
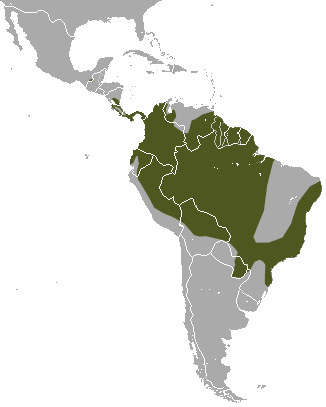
- Brown four-eyed opossum range

= Brown four-eyed opossum =

Species of marsupial

The brown four-eyed opossum (Metachirus nudicaudatus) is a pouchless marsupial of the family Didelphidae. It is found in different forested habitats of Central and South America, from Nicaragua to Brazil and northern Argentina, including southeastern Colombia, Paraguay and eastern Peru and Bolivia, at elevations from sea level to 1,500 m (4,900 ft). It is the only recognized species in the genus Metachirus, but molecular phylogenetics studies suggest that it should probably be split into several species. Population densities are usually low, and it is uncommon in parts of Central America. A density of 25.6/km^{2} (66/sq mi) was reported near Manaus, Brazil. Its karyotype has 2n = 14 and FN = 24.

It is a nocturnal, solitary, strongly terrestrial and omnivorous animal, feeding on fruits, small vertebrates and invertebrates.

The brown four-eyed opossum builds nests made of leaves and twigs in tree branches or under rocks and logs. It is seasonally polyestrous and the litter size varies from one to nine.

The white spot over each eye inspired the common name of "four-eyed opossum". Its scaly tail is longer than its body.

The opossum is mostly insectivorous, though it also consumes some types of fruit seeds, small vertebrates like birds and reptiles and invertebrates like crayfish and snails. The brown four-eyed opossum is a host of the acanthocephalan intestinal parasite Gigantorhynchus ortizi.
