= List of dasyproctids =

Species in mammal family Dasyproctidae

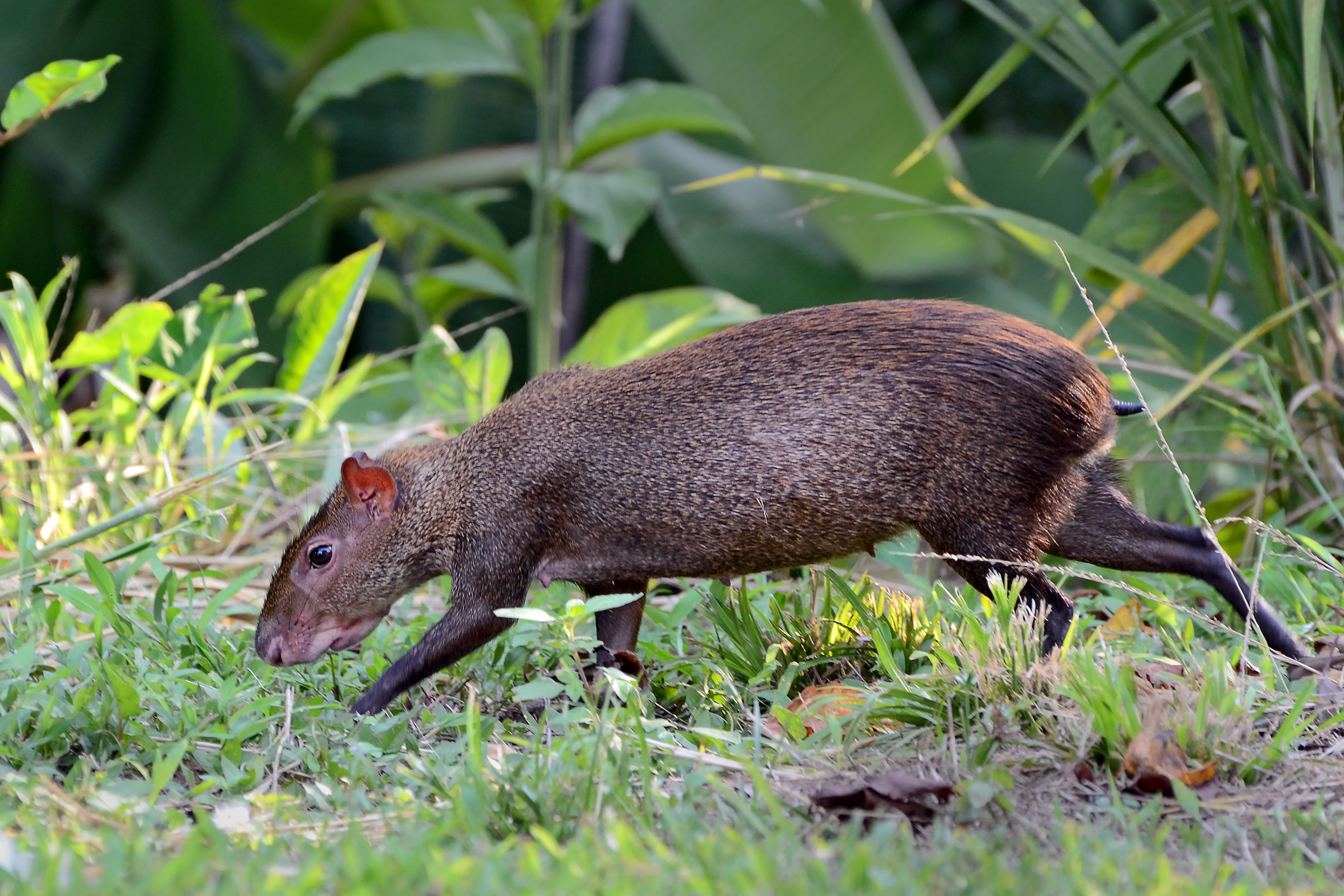
Central American agouti (Dasyprocta punctata)

Dasyproctidae is a family of mammals in the order Rodentia and part of the Caviomorpha parvorder. Members of this family are called dasyproctids and include agoutis and acouchis. They are found in Mexico, Central America, and South America, primarily in forests, though some species can be found in savannas. They range in size from the green acouchi, at 30 cm (12 in) plus a 4 cm (2 in) tail, to the black agouti, at 76 cm (30 in) plus a 4 cm (2 in) tail. Dasyproctids are herbivores and primarily eat fruit, vegetables, and succulent plants. No dasyproctids have population estimates, though the Ruatan Island agouti is categorized as an endangered species.

The fifteen extant species of Dasyproctidae are divided into two genera: Dasyprocta contains thirteen species of agoutis, while Myoprocta contains two species of achouchis. A few extinct prehistoric dasyproctid species have been discovered, though due to ongoing research and discoveries, the exact number and categorization is not fixed.

== Conventions ==
IUCN Red List categories
Conservation status
- EX: Extinct (0 species)
- EW: Extinct in the wild (0 species)
- CR: Critically endangered (0 species)
- EN: Endangered (1 species)
- VU: Vulnerable (1 species)
- NT: Near threatened (2 species)
- LC: Least concern (6 species)

Other categories
- DD: Data deficient (5 species)
- NE: Not evaluated (0 species)

The author citation for the species or genus is given after the scientific name; parentheses around the author citation indicate that this was not the original taxonomic placement. Conservation status codes listed follow the International Union for Conservation of Nature (IUCN) Red List of Threatened Species. Range maps are provided wherever possible; if a range map is not available, a description of the dasyproctid's range is provided. Ranges are based on the IUCN Red List for that species unless otherwise noted.

== Classification ==
Dasyproctidae is a family consisting of fifteen extant species in two genera. Dasyprocta contains thirteen species of agoutis, while Myoprocta contains two species of achouchis.

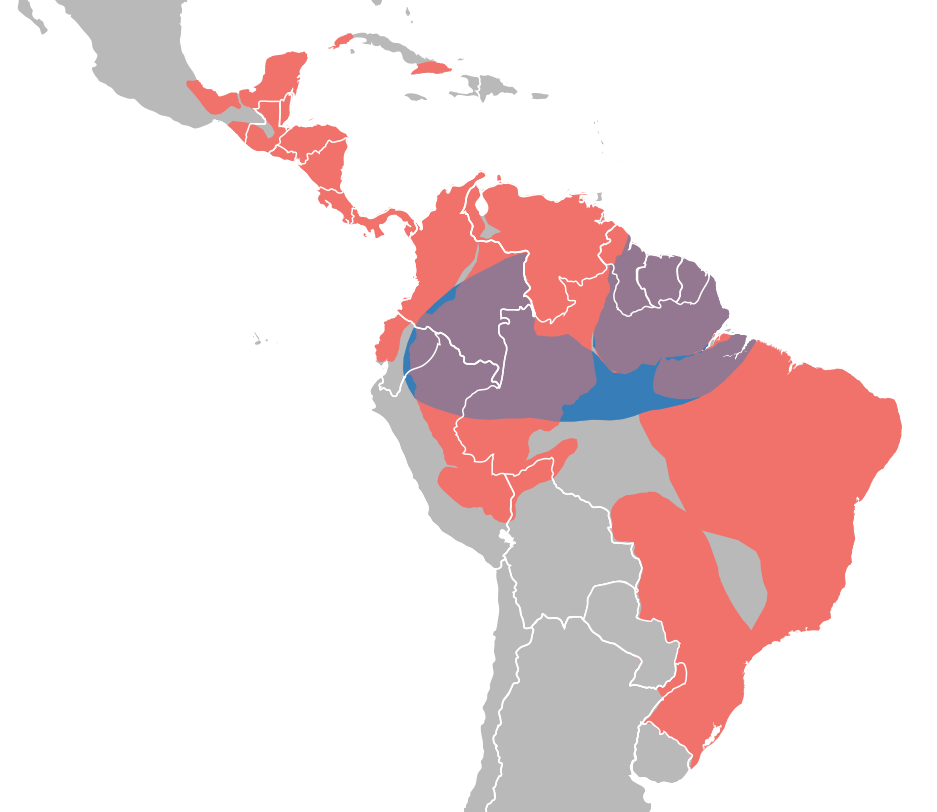
Dasyproctidae distribution. Dasyprocta in red; Myoprocta in blue (darker where ranges overlap)

== Dasyproctids ==
The following classification is based on the taxonomy described by the reference work Mammal Species of the World (2005), with augmentation by generally accepted proposals made since using molecular phylogenetic analysis, as supported by both the IUCN and the American Society of Mammalogists.

Genus Dasyprocta – Bonaparte, 1838 – thirteen species
Common name	Scientific name and subspecies	Range	Size and ecology	IUCN status and estimated population
Azara's agouti	D. azarae Lichtenstein, 1823	Central and southeastern South America	Size: 43–57 cm (17–22 in) long, plus 1–4 cm (0.4–1.6 in) tail Habitat: Forest Diet: Fruit, vegetables, and succulent plants	DD Unknown
Black agouti	D. fuliginosa Wagler, 1832 Two subspecies: D. f. candelensis; D. f. fuliginosa	Northwestern South America	Size: 54–76 cm (21–30 in) long, plus 2–4 cm (1–2 in) tail Habitat: Forest Diet: Fruit, vegetables, and succulent plants	LC Unknown
Black-rumped agouti	D. prymnolopha Wagler, 1831	Eastern Brazil	Size: 45–52 cm (18–20 in) long, plus 1–3 cm (0.4–1.2 in) tail Habitat: Forest and savanna Diet: Fruit, vegetables, and succulent plants	LC Unknown
Brown agouti	D. variegata Tschudi, 1845	Western South America	Size: 44–54 cm (17–21 in) long, plus 1–4 cm (0.4–1.6 in) tail Habitat: Forest Diet: Fruit, vegetables, and succulent plants	DD Unknown
Central American agouti	D. punctata Gray, 1842 Eighteen subspecies: D. p. bellula; D. p. boliviae; D. p. callida; D. p. chiapensis; D. p. chocoensis; D. p. columbiana; D. p. dariensis; D. p. isthmica; D. p. nuchalis; D. p. pallidiventris; D. p. pandora; D. p. punctata; D. p. richmondi; D. p. underwoodi; D. p. urucuma; D. p. yucatanica; D. p. yungarum; D. p. zamorae	Southeastern Mexico, Central America, and northwestern South America	Size: 48–60 cm (19–24 in) long, plus 2–6 cm (1–2 in) tail Habitat: Forest Diet: Fruit, seeds, vegetables, and succulent plants, as well as crabs	LC Unknown
Coiban agouti	D. coibae Thomas, 1902	Island of Coiba in Panama	Size: 43–45 cm (17–18 in) long, plus 3–4 cm (1–2 in) tail Habitat: Forest Diet: Fruit, vegetables, and succulent plants	NT Unknown
Iack's red-rumped agouti	D. iacki Feijó & Langguth, 2013	Eastern Brazil	Size: 44–50 cm (17–20 in) long, plus tail Habitat: Forest Diet: Fruit, vegetables, and succulent plants	DD Unknown
Kalinowski's agouti	D. kalinowskii Thomas, 1897	Southern Peru	Size: About 63 cm (25 in) long, plus about 2 cm (1 in) tail Habitat: Forest Diet: Fruit, vegetables, and succulent plants	DD Unknown
Mexican agouti	D. mexicana Saussure, 1860	Southern Mexico and Cuba (introduced)	Size: 44–56 cm (17–22 in) long, plus 2–3 cm (1 in) tail Habitat: Forest Diet: Fruit, vegetables, and succulent plants	VU Unknown
Orange agouti	D. croconota Wagler, 1831	Northern Brazil	Size: 46–56 cm (18–22 in) long, plus 1–3 cm (0.4–1.2 in) tail Habitat: Forest Diet: Fruit, vegetables, and succulent plants	DD Unknown
Orinoco agouti	D. guamara Ojasti, 1972	Eastern Venezuela	Size: 47–56 cm (19–22 in) long, plus 2–3 cm (1 in) tail Habitat: Forest Diet: Fruit, vegetables, and succulent plants	NT Unknown
Red-rumped agouti	D. leporina (Linnaeus, 1758) Eight subspecies: D. l. albida; D. l. cayana; D. l. croconota; D. l. fulvus; D. l. leporina; D. l. lunaris; D. l. maraxica; D. l. noblei	Northern South America	Size: 47–65 cm (19–26 in) long, plus 1–3 cm (0.4–1.2 in) tail Habitat: Forest Diet: Fruit, vegetables, and succulent plants	LC Unknown
Ruatan Island agouti	D. ruatanica Thomas, 1901	Island of Roatán in Honduras	Size: About 43 cm (17 in) long, plus tail Habitat: Forest Diet: Fruit, vegetables, and succulent plants	EN Unknown

Genus Myoprocta – Thomas, 1903 – two species
Common name	Scientific name and subspecies	Range	Size and ecology	IUCN status and estimated population
Green acouchi	M. pratti Pocock, 1913	Northern South America	Size: 30–38 cm (12–15 in) long, plus 4–6 cm (2 in) tail Habitat: Forest Diet: Fruit, seeds, vegetables, and succulent plants	LC Unknown
Red acouchi	M. acouchy Erxleben, 1777	Northern South America	Size: 33–39 cm (13–15 in) long, plus 5–8 cm (2–3 in) tail Habitat: Forest Diet: Fruit, seeds, vegetables, and succulent plants	LC Unknown

== Sources ==
- Chernasky, Amy; Motis, Anna; Burgin, Connor, eds. (2023). All the Mammals of the World. Lynx Nature Books. ISBN 978-84-16728-66-4.
- Nowak, Ronald M. (1999). Walker's Mammals of the World. Vol. 2 (6th ed.). Johns Hopkins University Press. ISBN 978-0-8018-5789-8.
- Woods, Charles A.; Kilpatrick, C. William (2005). Wilson, Don E.; Reeder, DeeAnn M. (eds.). Mammal Species of the World. Vol. 2 (3rd ed.). Johns Hopkins University Press. ISBN 978-0-8018-8221-0.
