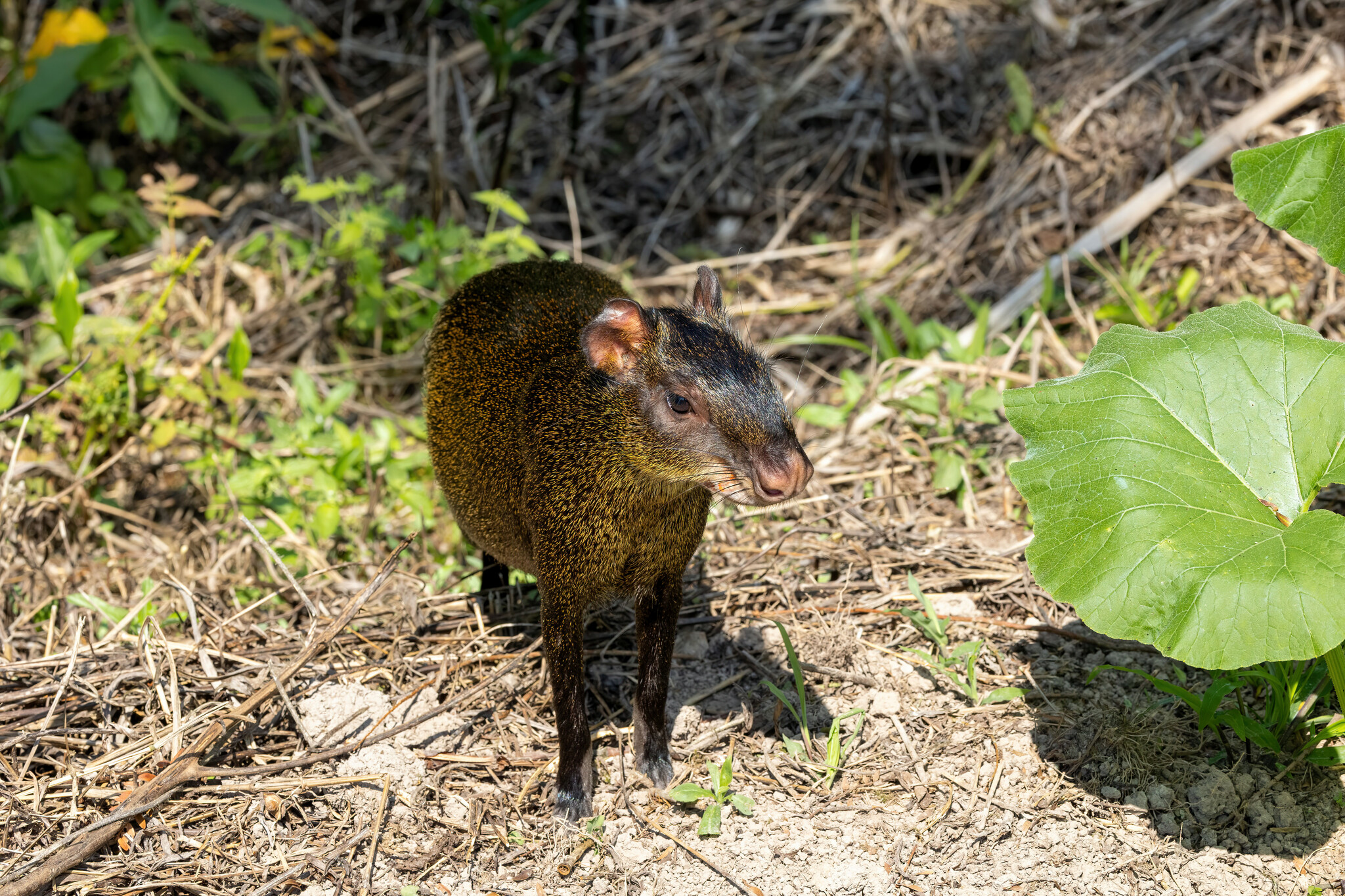
- An individual in 2022

Conservation status
- Data Deficient (IUCN 3.1)

Scientific classification
- Kingdom: Animalia
- Phylum: Chordata
- Class: Mammalia
- Order: Rodentia
- Family: Dasyproctidae
- Genus: Dasyprocta
- Species: D. variegata

Binomial name
- Dasyprocta variegata Tschudi, 1845
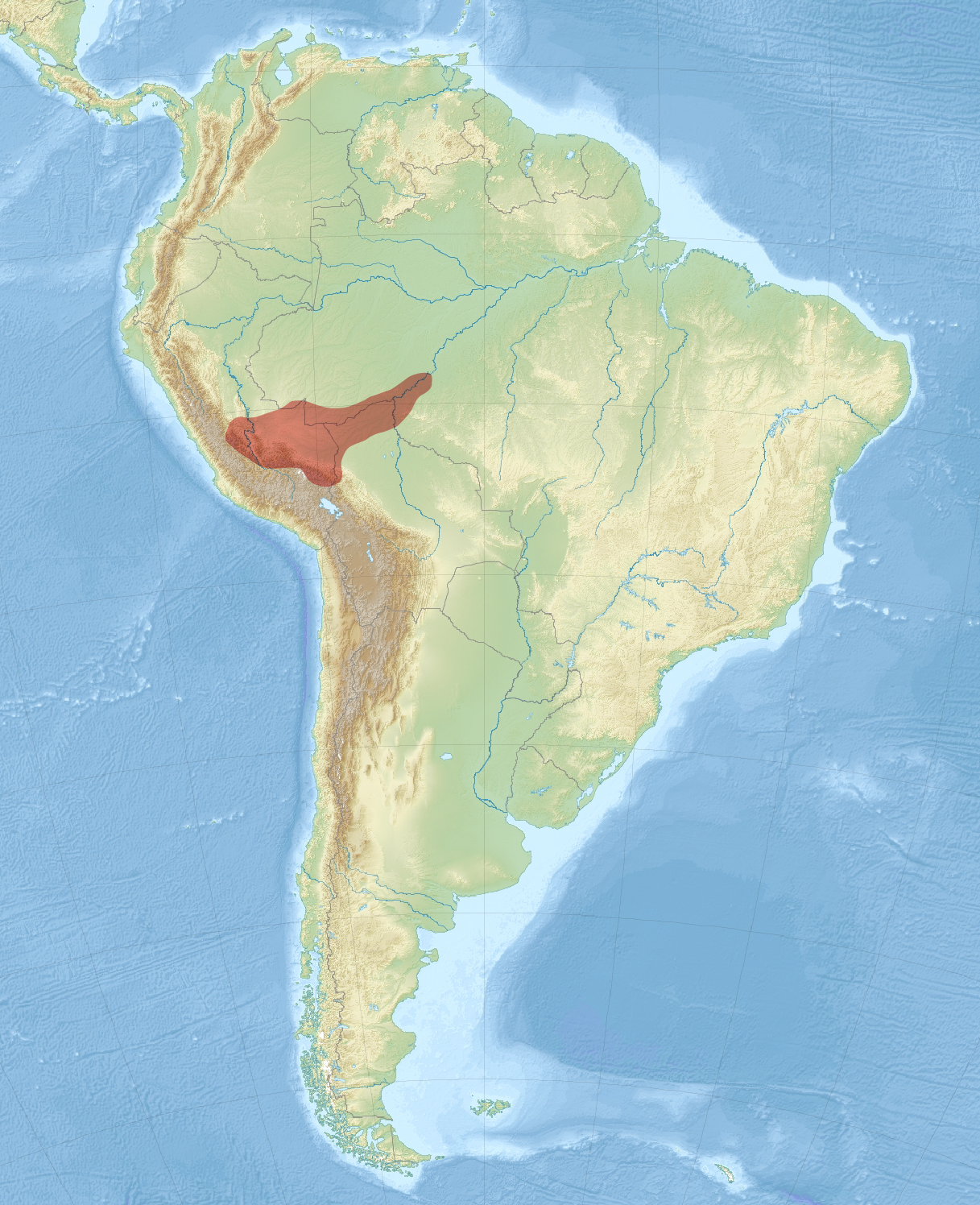
- Brown agouti range

Synonyms
- • Dasyprocta punctata variegata Tschudi

= Brown agouti =

Species of rodent

The brown agouti (Dasyprocta variegata) is a species of agouti in the family Dasyproctidae that is native to portions of central or southeastern Peru, east to western Brazil (specifically within the administrative divisions of Acre, Amazonas, and Rondônia), south to a strip of Bolivia. It was originally regarded as conspecific with the Central American agouti (Dasyprocta punctata), but revised as distinct.

The brown agouti has an orange-brown body, with an average length of 61 cm (24.01 in), and a weight of 1.8 kg (3.96 lbs). Dark head, rump, and midline of the back. Peruvian individuals have a fairly different and distinctive coloration (see text below). The species is commonly preyed upon by the South American jaguar.

The brown agouti is known to reside near Brazil nut trees (Bertholletia excelsa) in forested cover, and around gardens, or plantations.

== Taxonomy ==
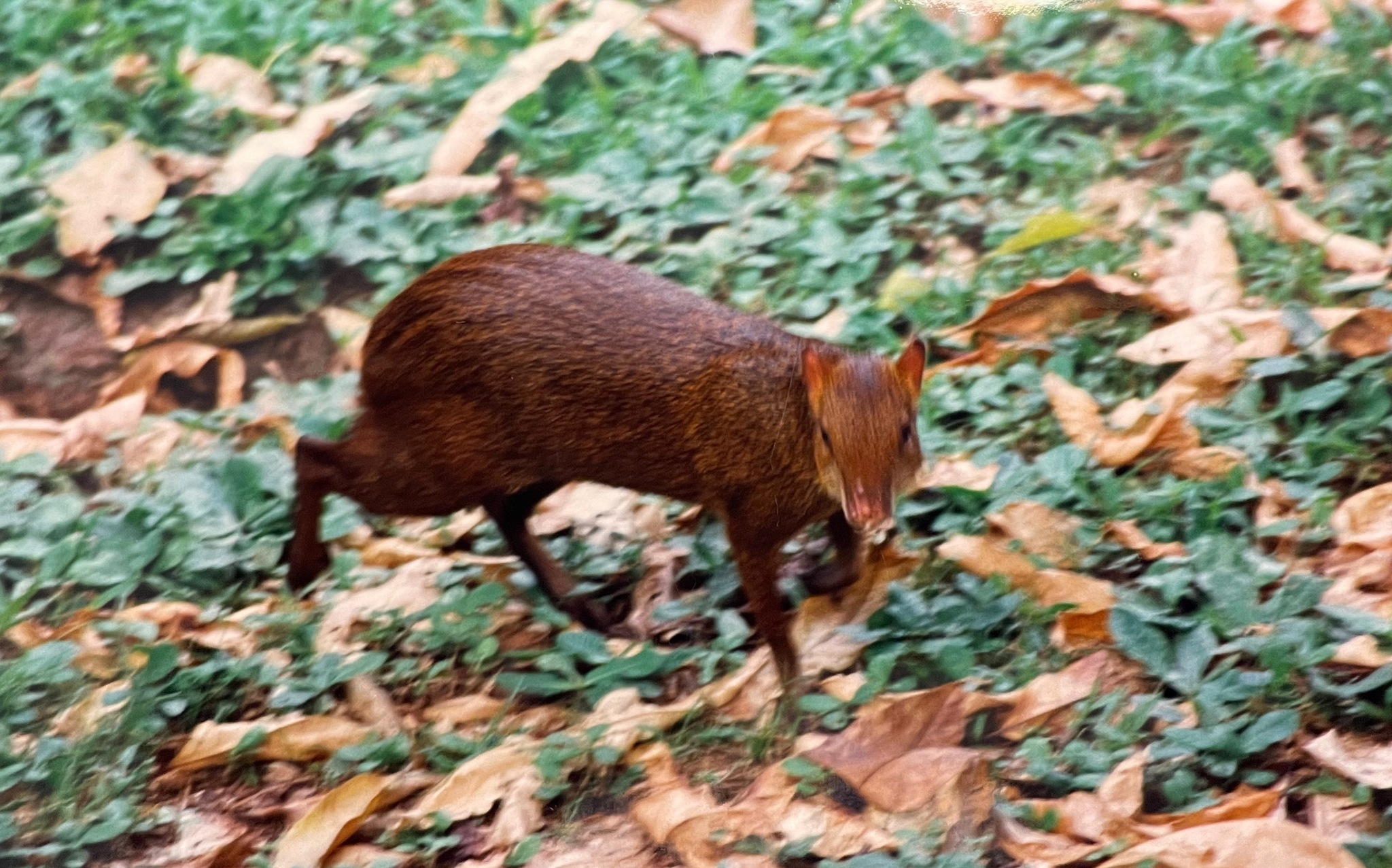
A brown agouti seen running

The brown agouti was previously regarded as a subspecies of the Central American agouti (Dasyprocta punctata), but has now been elevated to species status, for multivariate statistical analysis and morphological differences have revealed such. Although there is evidence for a species elevation, most authorities still list it as a subspecies. It is distinct from the Central American agouti by having an orange-colored body, whilst the Central American agouti has a reddish-brown to a yellowish-brown, or even a yellowish-grey colored body depending on the subspecies. It also differs by having a darker head, midline of the back, and occasionally a darker rump. Individuals in Peru have been said to be "black-frosted with white and yellow" colorations. Skull size and general structure are also different in both species.

Its range is extremely disputed, for some believe its southern extent lies in northern Bolivia, although a part of a similar species, Azara's agouti (Dasyprocta azarae) in northern Argentina, central Bolivia, and western Paraguay has been shown to be populations of the brown agouti.

=== Subspecies ===
There are three proposed subspecies, alternately considered a part of the Central American agouti subspecies complex:

- Dasyprocta variegata variegata - southeastern Peru, east into Brazil, and southeast into far northwestern Bolivia
- Dasyprocta variegata yungarum - Yungas brown agouti - central and eastern Bolivia
- Dasyprocta variegata boliviae - Bolivian brown agouti - southern Bolivia, east into Paraguay, and south into northern Argentina

== Conservation ==
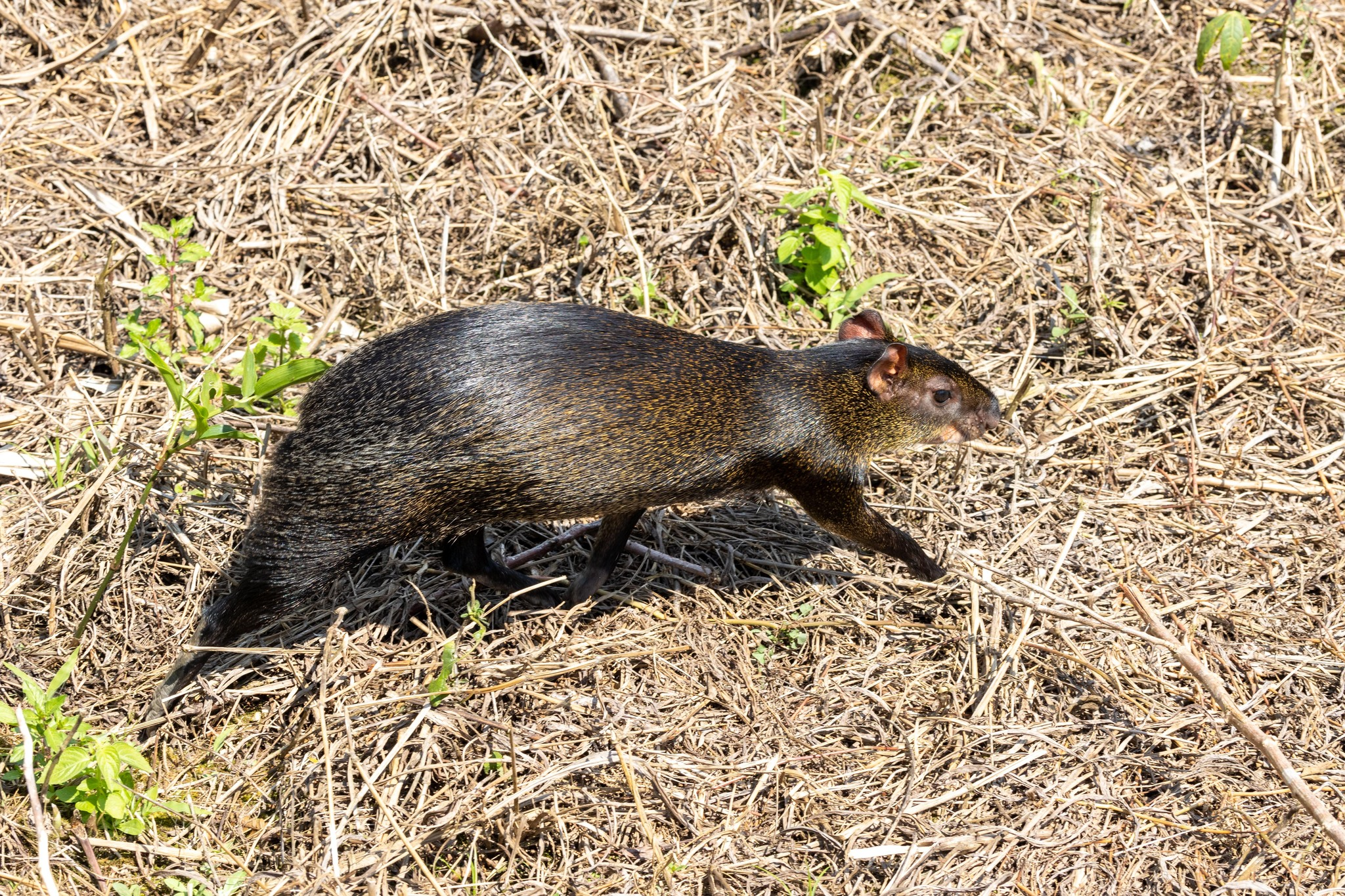
The brown agouti (Dasyprocta variegata)

The brown agouti is listed as "Data Deficient" by the IUCN Red List, for there is very limited information on its populations, and possible threats, although deforestation and agricultural land clearance are quite likely; as seen in most portions of the western and eastern Amazon rainforest.

== Diet ==
The brown agouti has been said to eat various fruits, leaves, tubers, bulbs, and roots. This is seen in other rodent species, including other members of the genus Dasyprocta.
