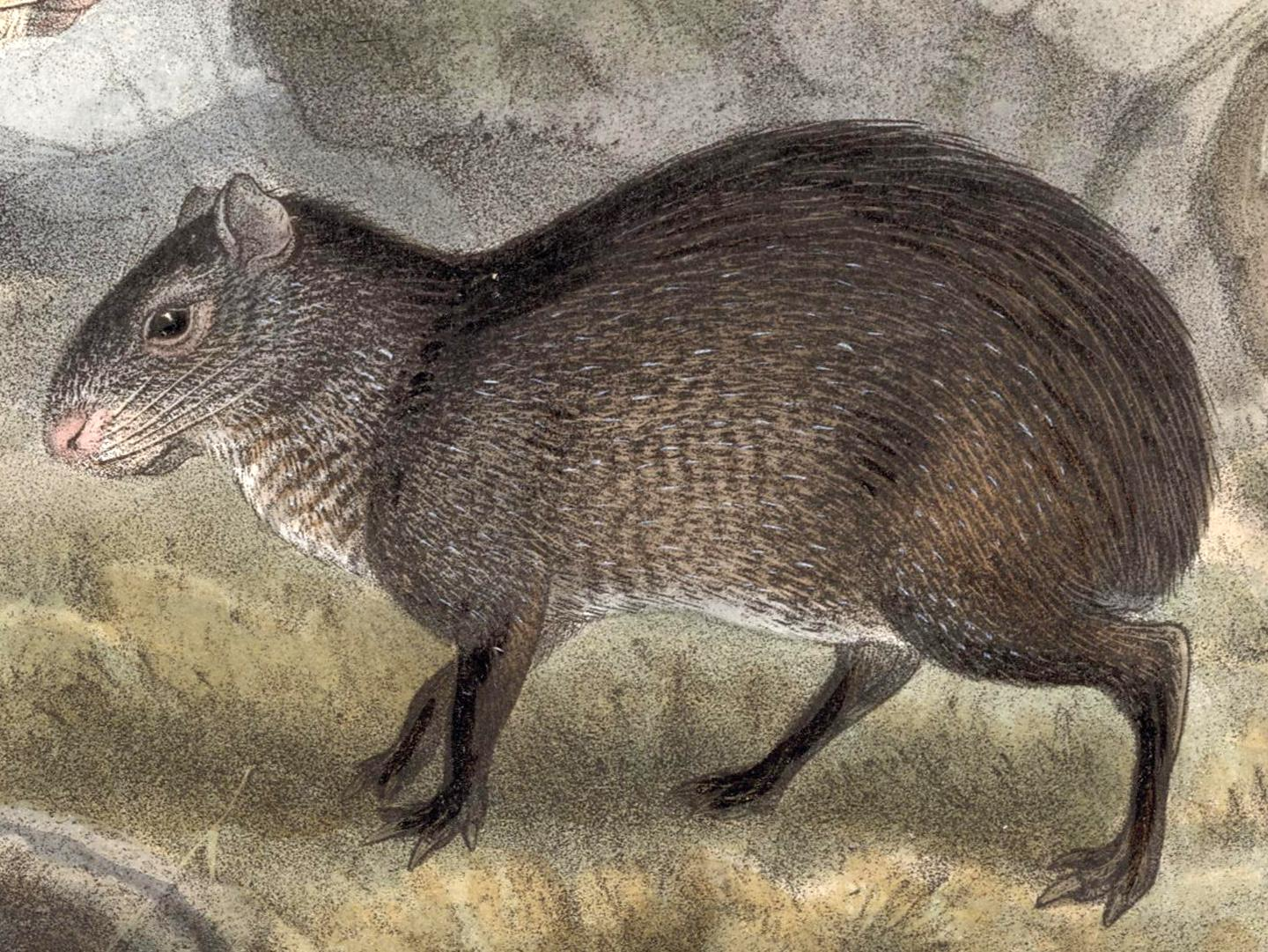

Conservation status
- Vulnerable (IUCN 3.1)

Scientific classification
- Kingdom: Animalia
- Phylum: Chordata
- Class: Mammalia
- Order: Rodentia
- Family: Dasyproctidae
- Genus: Dasyprocta
- Species: D. mexicana

Binomial name
- Dasyprocta mexicana Saussure, 1860
- Distribution range, green - native, blue - introduced

= Mexican agouti =

Species of rodent

The Mexican agouti, (Dasyprocta mexicana), also known as the Mexican black agouti, is a species of rodent in the genus Dasyprocta. This species was first discovered in 1860 in Veracruz, Mexico and described by Henri Louis Frédéric de Saussure.

== Physical description ==
Dasyprocta mexicana is a medium-sized rodent, weighing between 2 kilograms to 4 kilograms as an adult. This length of D. mexicana ranges from 40 centimeters to 60 centimeters, which is inclusive of the tail that ranges from 2 centimeters to 3 centimeters in length and is located at the most posterior point of the body. While data is limited on the height of this particular species, it is expected to be similar to the average height of 23 centimeters seen in similar sized agoutis.

The head and body of D. mexicana constitute majority of this length, as this portion is on average 44.6 centimeters to 56 centimeters long. The dorsal areas of the head and body of D. mexicana possess either a black or darkened brown coat colour, distinguishing this species from other members in their genus. Throughout this darkened coat, white hairs are sparingly dispersed. Additionally, different portions of the rodent's head and back can be marked by differences in hair length, with the rump and nape areas possessing longer, solid black hairs compared to the remainder of the rodent's body.

The underside of D. mexicana's body, including the chin and throat, display a slightly different colouration than the dorsum, with hairs being paler, and predominantly white in colour. Areas of lighter colouration are also evident around the eyes and at the base of the ears (3.5 centimeters to 4.7 centimeters in length) of this species, as the skin exposed in this area appears pink in colour.

The overall shape of D. mexicana's back is rounded, with two pairs of thin, elongate legs attaching to the anterior and posterior ends. While the claws of these limbs possess fingers, the terrestrial lifestyle of agouti species has encouraged a reduction in the number of digits, in addition to the presence of a vestigial thumb. The smaller, anterior set of legs are the forelegs, which possess four arched finger-like claws assisting in the agouti's ability to excavate. The much larger, posterior set of legs are the hindlegs, which have been modified to have only three digits. The size difference which exists between the hindlegs and the forelegs has allotted agoutis with the ability to jump.

Notably, there is no sexual dimorphism documented in this species, making palpation of reproductive organs the only way to physically distinguish between sexes in this species.

== Geographic range ==
Dasyprocta mexicana is a terrestrial species native to Mexico, where it can be found throughout the lowlands of Gulf of Mexico in Veracruz, Oaxaca, Tabasco, and Chiapas. This species' range has broadened, as it has been introduced and is currently extant in Western and Eastern areas in Cuba.

== Habitat ==
D. mexicana occupies terrestrial habitats, with a strong preference and specialization for humid tropical rainforests, lowland evergreen forests, and second growth forests. This rodent can withstand a relatively broad range in elevation, with documentation of this species inhabiting elevations between 50 and 600 meters.

While limited information is available pertaining to how D. mexicana utilizes its habitat, research conducted on the Central American agouti (Dasyprocta punctata) found that D. punctata centered its home range around important food sources such as fruit trees, and that they find refuge within their habitat in places such as the trunks of these trees. Given that D. punctata is physically similar and shares many life history traits with D. mexicana, including parts of their geographic ranges, it is hypothesized that D. mexicana utilizes its habitat in a similar manner.

== Development ==
There is limited information available on development within the Mexican agouti. It is known that young are born precocial, and covered in fur with their eyes open. Female agoutis have been found to nurse pups until weaning for up to 7 weeks post-partum, but young are tolerated and remain in their territory post-weaning.

In spite of the precocial behaviour of pups, they exhibit various activities in the wild. Within a day of birth, pups engage in nursing, grooming, and foraging in leaf litter. While the lactating female does not directly provide solid food to the pups, the pups often accompany her during foraging and consume the same food she eats. It is expected that learning plays a significant role in their development, including shaping their food preferences, however over time, pups have been seen to explore and consume foods other than those introduced by their mother.

== Parental roles ==
During pregnancy, agoutis have been observed to increase the number of seeds in their diet, to heighten their protein, fat, and energy content. Females use crevices and existing burrows to birth and raise their pups. Female agoutis are known to nurse pups for up to 7 weeks until weaning, however, lactating females do not directly provide their pups with food. Instead, pups follow the female and learn how to forage and consume the same food as her.

== Reproduction ==
Socially, the Mexican agouti is known to possess a monogamous mating system through the formation breeding pairs for reproduction. Each pair occupies a territory that spans 1 to 2 hectares. D. mexicana undergoes viviparous reproduction, with a gestation cycle approximated to last between 104 and 120 days. While the exact age of sexual maturity is not documented in the Mexican agouti, closely related Dasyprocta species have been found to reach sexual maturity as early as 6 months old. On average, 1 or 2 young tend to be born during the dry season, March to May, by each breeding pair.

== Lifespan ==
A study conducted on the longevity of the Mexican agouti in captivity found that it had a maximum longevity of 13.1 years, however it was conducted using a small sample size.

== Behaviour ==
D. mexicana is a very agile and alert species, readily prepared to run and escape danger. Thus, the behaviour of D. mexicana is greatly driven by its surrounding environment, including the presence of humans and other predators. This species, likewise to other members of the Dasyproctidae family, is naturally diurnal and crepuscular. However, they can shift into a nocturnal lifecycle when threatened and under pressure, as a means of predator avoidance and attempt to increases their chances of survival. This shift towards nocturnal behaviour in D. mexicana is frequently observed in areas where humans actively hunt this species.

== Senses and communication ==
The Mexican agouti has been documented to release a series of sharp nasal barks and stomp their feet as an alarm call while running escaping danger.

== Food collection and consumption ==
D. mexicana is a scatter-holding frugivore, with its diet being composed primarily of the fruits of soft seeds and new-growth forest plants. While information is limited on the food habits and specific diet constituents of D. mexicana, known information on the feeding activity of other Dasyprocta species outlined below is believed to align with the behaviours of the Mexican agouti.

All Dasyprocta species are currently known to be frugivores. Dasyprocta leporine has a wild diet which is 87% fruit, 6% animal matter, 4% fibrous foods, and 2% leaves, which is predicted to be similar in composition to the diet of D. mexicana. However, variations exist in the proportions of each food type consumed as a reflection of the on and off times of the fruit season, with diets being richer in fruit constituents during peak fruit season. In captivity, Dasyprocta species appeared to have a preference for foods with a high energy content and low water content, however, there is limited knowledge available of the dietary requirements of agouti species. Examples of some food items that wild Dasyprocta species have been observed eating include: citrus fruit and coconuts, avocado, mango, pineapple, tomato, papaya, melon, queen palm, leaves, flowers, roots, corn, rice, almonds, black palm, Brazil nuts, dry palm pyrenes, and invertebrates.

Capturing of these food items is accomplished through the scatter-hoarding behaviour of Dasyprocta species, where seeds and nuts are typically cached individually once the fruit pulp is removed. The retrieval of these seeds often occurs after the fruiting season, with retrievals being reported to occur up to 8 months after their initial burial. This caching process generally entails burying the seeds into holes 2 to 8 centimetres deep, and then covering the holes with soils and leaf matter for protection. In the wild, pregnant Dasyprocta species have been documented to increase the amounts of seeds in their diet, which in turn increases protein, fat, and energy content.

Once individuals have captured food, to help with the consumption and breakdown of food items, Dasyprocta members possess what is known as the generalist feeder, rodent dentition, with a dental formula of I 1/1, C 0/0, P 1/1, M 3/3. To increase resistance to compressive strain and provide a sharp edge for shaving and chiselling food items, the incisors of Dasyprotca species continuously grow and possess restricted enamel on their anteroventral surface. Additionally, within these species, there are 2 main types of occlusions that arise from the movement of the jaw: the first being contact between the cheek teeth for mastication of animal and plant foods, and the second being contact between the incisors to assist in gnawing and chewing. The upper and lower incisors of these species serve different roles, with upper incisors being responsible for cutting plant matter, and piercing animal food sources, while the bottom incisors cut and shear food.

=== Predation ===
Similar to other agouti species, the known predators of Dasyprocta mexicana include cats, birds of prey, snakes, and jaguars. In addition, extensive hunting of this species has also resulted in heightened predation of the Mexican agouti by humans. Given the vast amount of species that prey on agoutis, to minimize conflict and predation threats, when at rest agoutis stay hidden in burrows or tree trunks. In the instance that agoutis come into contact with predators, they can employ various strategies to avoid or minimize conflict, such as freezing in place, making alarm calls to alert other agoutis, or raising the hairs on their rump as a scare tactic.

While agoutis are frugivores, predominantly forming mutualistic relationships with plants while feeding on and dispersing their seeds, there are a few instances of traditional antagonistic predatory relationships within this genus. While limited research is available, in some cases, plants have been observed to negatively respond to agoutis using their seeds. Additionally, while limited data is accessible, agoutis have been recorded to eat insect larvae when seed and nut sources are limited.

=== Mutualism ===
Generalized research has been done on mutualistic interactions in other agouti species, which are believed to exhibit similar behaviours to D. mexicana.

The major mutualistic relationship documented in agoutis is their relationship with plant communities. Agoutis are important seed dispersers, who often bury their seeds, to later cache them during periods of food scarcity. The seeds which agoutis utilize reflect a careful consideration of various factors including abundance, mass, and nutritional value. This mutualistic relationship arises as agoutis feed on fruits and nuts of plants, gaining a rich source of nutrients which they need to survive. While feeding, agoutis assist in seed dispersal of plants, by caching the seeds in favourable environments that encourage germination, and through diplochory, where they act as secondary dispersers by scattering and burying seeds found in the feces of other animals. This seed dispersal plants receive from agoutis thus benefits both their reproductive capacities by encouraging a greater proportion of germination amongst their seeds, and their ability to expand across a greater habitat range.

== Ecosystem roles ==
While Dasyprocta mexicana serves a vital role in ecosystems, both through seed dispersal and their positioning in food webs, there is minimal information pertaining specifically to this species. However, more generalized information on the logistics of these roles in other agouti species is available and expected to reflect the contributions of Dasyprocta mexicana.

In regards to seed dispersal, agoutis act as secondary dispersers of seeds through their digging, hiding, and seeking behaviours. Specifically, they partake in the short-distance dispersal of tree seeds, which is an action secondary to the long-distance dispersal of these seeds by other species, such as Tapirus terrestris. This dispersal is crucial to the ability for seeds to germinate, allowing various plant species to continue to prosper.

This is well depicted through the crucial role agouti species are expected to play in the survival of Brazil nut trees. Agoutis are one of few animals that are reported to be capable of opening the thick husk on Brazil nut seeds. This is a crucial component, as the husk must be removed for the seeds to germinate. Thus, in the absence of agoutis, there can be significant ecological implications for the prosperity of Brazil nut trees, and ecosystems as a whole.

The capacity for agoutis to support the germination of various plants further ties into their important links to food chains. By helping different plants reproduce and prosper, they are maintaining balance in food chains by ensuring that species that feed on these plants have an adequate and consistent supply of food. Additionally, their role as prey to various birds, snakes, and wild carnivores plays an important role in maintaining balance in the food web as in their absence, various species would be left to find alternative food sources, resulting in a disruption of the ecosystem.

== Economic importance ==
Human consumption of the Mexican agouti has significantly increased the species' economic importance. Given its high protein content, within its geographic range, this species has become a widely consumed, valuable source of protein. Agouti meat is prized for its white, nutrient-rich, and flavourful characteristics, which offer a plentiful supply of calcium and phosphorus while remaining low in caloric content; approximately 120 Kcal per 100 grams of meat. While a larger-scale commercialization of agouti meat yields a low market value, the production of this product requires minimal labour, and fattening and breeding procedures have the capacity to be practiced simultaneously to maximize producer profits. In certain regions of the world, such as Trinidad and Tobago, agouti meat has become highly appreciated and thought of as a delicacy, which has encouraged the extensive hunting of D. mexicana. The Mexican agouti has also been used as a valuable source of skin, leather, and bristles in certain regions.

While there are many economic benefits of D. mexiciana, this species has also posed some negative economic threats, predominantly as an invasive species. In the 1930s, when the Mexican agouti, alongside 2 other agouti species, were brought from Mexico to Sierra de los Órganos and Sierra Cristal in Cuba, they were thought to have the potential to compete with the Desmarest's hutia for food and shelter due to niche overlap. While they have spread across the western region of Cuba and moved up to areas like San Diego, Soroa, and Guanahacabibes since then, sightings of these invasive species have decreased, and they do not appear to be posing any significant economic or ecological threats at the current moment.

== Conservation status ==
While the Mexican agouti was previously deemed as near threatened by the IUCN in 1996, it is now regarded as a vulnerable species. Currently, there is a continuous decrease in the number of mature individuals within the rodent's population, driven by continuous habitat loss within their preferred habitat range. D. mexicana is confined to a small range of habitats, thus the conversion of suitable lands into agricultural fields and urban use puts this rodent at risk, as it is unable to capitalize off of opportunities and resources outside of the habitat they occupy. Hunting threats have also contributed to population declines in the Mexican agouti, as this species has become a popular delicacy within its home range. The flesh of the species is an excellent source of nutrients making it hunted by a variety of individuals, including humans, hares, and rabbits.

While D. mexicana is currently found in select protected areas of Mexico, limited information is available on a species-specific plan for conservation. It is believed that further research on the population size, distribution, and trends of the Mexican agouti is still needed to determine the best conservation practices for this individual.
