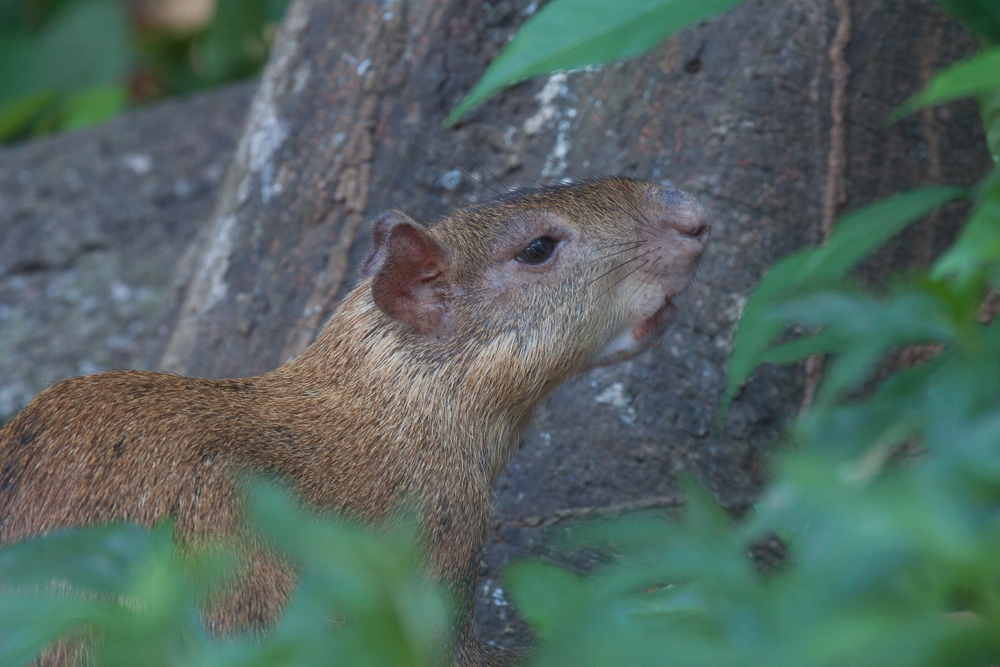

Conservation status
- Near Threatened (IUCN 3.1)

Scientific classification
- Kingdom: Animalia
- Phylum: Chordata
- Class: Mammalia
- Order: Rodentia
- Family: Dasyproctidae
- Genus: Dasyprocta
- Species: D. coibae

Binomial name
- Dasyprocta coibae Thomas, 1902

= Coiban agouti =

Species of rodent

The Coiban agouti (Dasyprocta coibae) is a species of rodent in the family Dasyproctidae. It is endemic to the island of Coiba (Panama) and resembles the more widespread Central American agouti. It is threatened by habitat loss.
