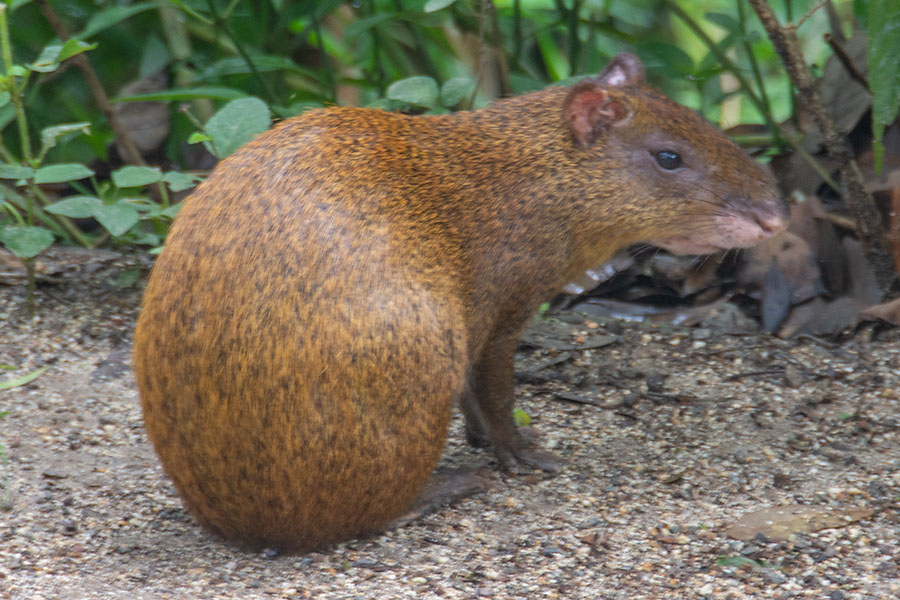

Conservation status
- Endangered (IUCN 3.1)

Scientific classification
- Kingdom: Animalia
- Phylum: Chordata
- Class: Mammalia
- Order: Rodentia
- Family: Dasyproctidae
- Genus: Dasyprocta
- Species: D. ruatanica

Binomial name
- Dasyprocta ruatanica Thomas, 1901

= Ruatan Island agouti =

Ruatan Island Agouti

Species of rodent

The Ruatan Island agouti (Dasyprocta ruatanica), also called the Roatán Island agouti, is a species of agouti in the family Dasyproctidae. It is endemic to the island of Roatán, off the north coast of Honduras.

== Taxonomy ==
There are no known subspecies.

== Description ==
Ruatan Island agoutis closely resemble the widespread Central American agoutis, but are noticeably smaller in size, being only around 44 cm (17 in) in head-body length. Their fur is orange brown over their entire bodies, fading to a paler, olivaceous shade on the underparts, and with grizzled black ticking over their backs. There is a white spot on the chin, and a yellowish patch on the belly. Unlike the naked ears of Central American agoutis, those of the Ruatan Island species bear a few dark hairs.

The overall colour is said to be richer than that of Central American agoutis, although the differences are slight, so are less reliable than body size in distinguishing the two species.

== Behaviour ==
From the few studies conducted on the animal, they appear to be active both day and night, and are not territorial. They are timid, and flee at the sight of humans.

== Habitat ==
The animals inhabit brushy scrub forest across the island of Roatán, where they feed on almonds, coconuts, hibiscus, and Pentaclethra pods.

== Conservation ==
It is threatened by habitat loss and hunting. As the tourist industry has grown on their native island, hotels and other buildings are encroaching on their native habitat. While some remain in developed areas, living under hotel buildings and feeding off chicken grain and similar resources, most are now found in the hilly interior of the island, away from the coast.
