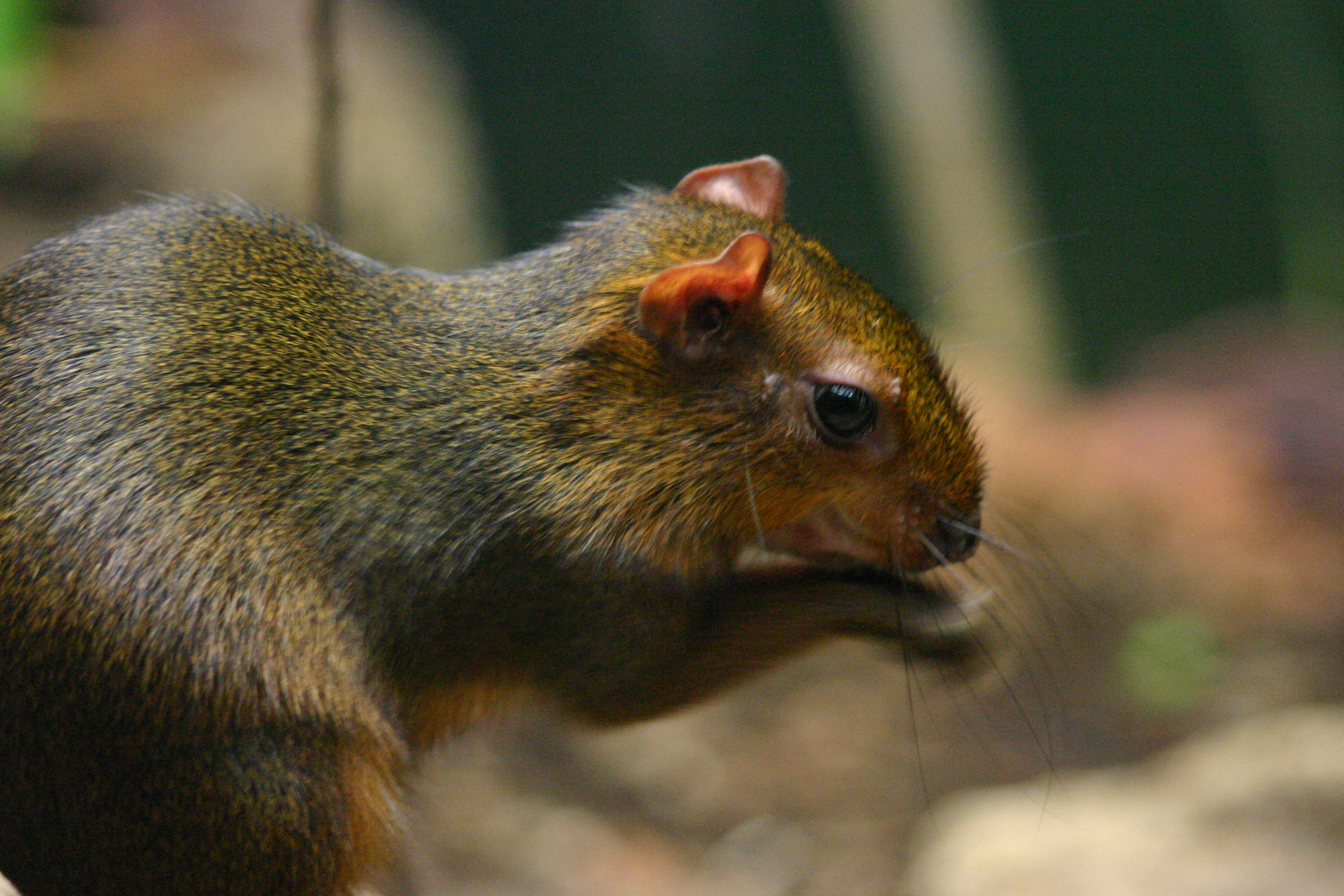
- Green acouchi

Scientific classification
- Kingdom: Animalia
- Phylum: Chordata
- Class: Mammalia
- Infraclass: Placentalia
- Order: Rodentia
- Family: Dasyproctidae
- Genus: Myoprocta; Thomas, 1903

Type species
- Cavia acouchy Erxleben, 1777

Species
- Myoprocta acouchy; Myoprocta pratti
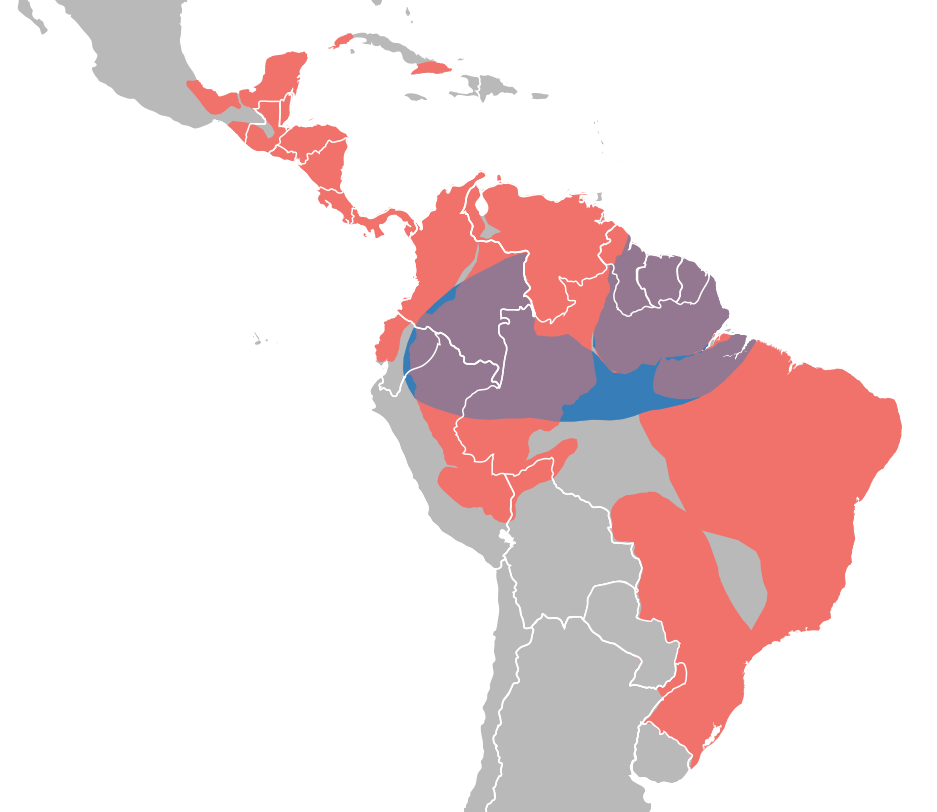
- Dasyproctidae distribution. Dasyprocta in red; Myoprocta in blue (darker where ranges overlap)

= Acouchi =

Genus of rodents

The acouchis (genus Myoprocta) are rodents belonging to the family Dasyproctidae from the Amazon basin. They are generally smaller than agoutis and have very short tails (5 to 7 cm), while agoutis lack tails. For this reason the acouchis are also called tailed agoutis.

The two species – the red acouchi (M. acouchy) in the Guianas of Amazonia and nearby parts of Brazil, and the green acouchi (M. pratti) in western Amazonia - differ in coloration and other characteristics. The taxonomy of the genus has historically been confused, with some authors applying the name M. acouchy to the green acouchi, in which case the red acouchi is called M. exilis. Although this issue has now been resolved, other problems remain; in particular, the green acouchi may include more than one species.

They are coloured brown or greenish, but with bright orange or red parts on their heads. Often, acouchis live in riverbanks, where they dig holes. Like the common agoutis, but unlike the much larger pacas, acouchis are active at day and feed on fruit.

Acouchis depend on their tails to convey their willingness and readiness to mate. Confident, ready males will hold their tails erect and begin to wag them, whereas the more timid, but still aroused, males will wag their tails in a downward position. Females will signal their interest by erecting their tails while simultaneously arching their backs downward. The litter size is generally two.

== In popular culture ==
"Acouchi" is one of the words that Leaf Coneybear is asked to spell in The 25th Annual Putnam County Spelling Bee.

== Literature cited ==
- Voss, R.S., Lunde, D.P. & Simmons, N.B. 2001. Mammals of Paracou, French Guiana: a Neotropical lowland rainforest fauna. Part 2. Nonvolant species. Bulletin of the American Museum of Natural History 263:1-236.
