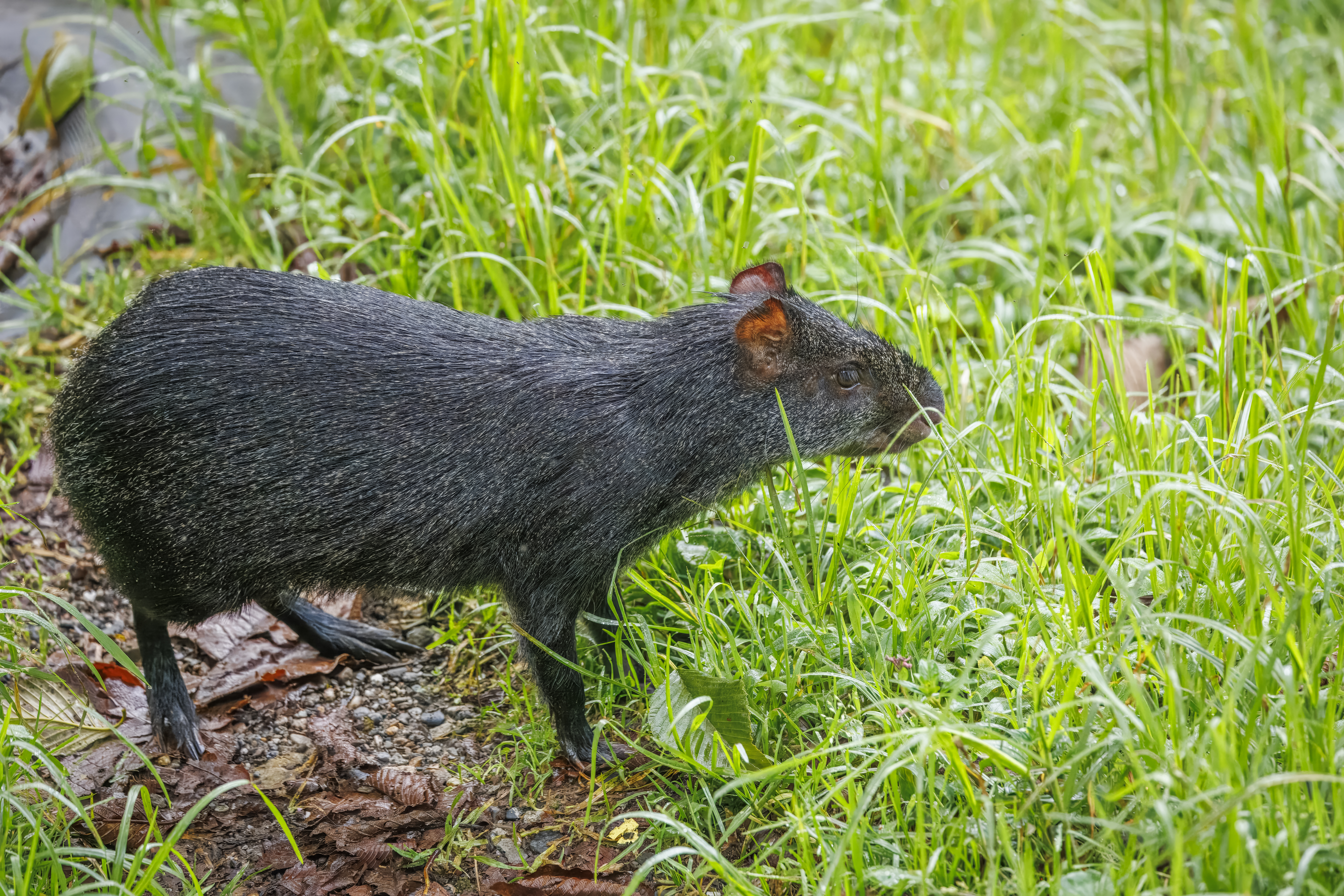

Conservation status
- Least Concern (IUCN 3.1)

Scientific classification
- Kingdom: Animalia
- Phylum: Chordata
- Class: Mammalia
- Order: Rodentia
- Family: Dasyproctidae
- Genus: Dasyprocta
- Species: D. fuliginosa

Binomial name
- Dasyprocta fuliginosa Wagler, 1832

= Black agouti =

Species of rodent

The black agouti (Dasyprocta fuliginosa) is a South American species of agouti from the family Dasyproctidae.

== Distribution and habitat ==
It is found in the northwestern Amazon in southern Venezuela, eastern Colombia, eastern Ecuador, western Brazil and northeastern Peru. There is also a disjunct population in the Magdalena River Valley of northern Colombia. They are found in forests, thick brush, savannas, and cultivated areas. In Peru, they are confined to the Amazonian region where they are found in all parts of the low selva zone and many parts of the high selva zone. It is found at altitudes of 2,000 metres (6,600 ft) and above. Agoutis live in close proximity to water, being found on the banks of all types of streams.

== Description ==
It is overall black grizzled white, and the throat is white. The black agouti weighs 3.5–6 kg (7.7–13.2 lb).

== Behavior ==
Like other agoutis, the black agouti is diurnal, lives alone or in pairs, and feeds on fruits and nuts. In some areas, they construct burrows among limestone boulders, along river banks, or under the roots of trees.

== Reproduction ==
The female black agouti is capable of breeding year-round. Also, they are considered to be seasonally polyestrous, meaning the females can go through more than one period of estrus in a single year. One estrus period can last for 24 hours while the estrous cycle can last between 30 and 34 days. Furthermore, the gestation period averages 104 days, and females are able to produce two newborns per litter.
