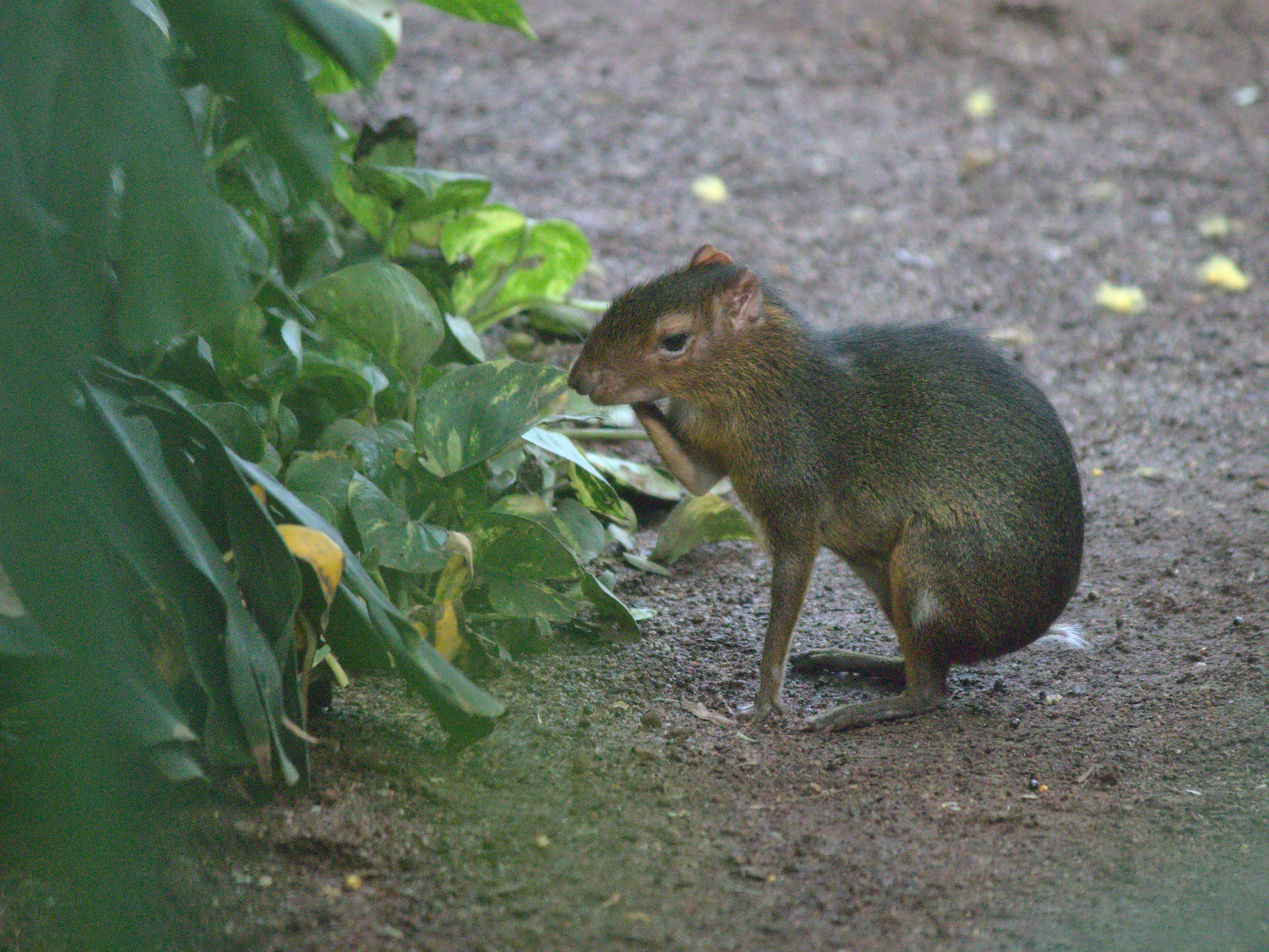

Conservation status
- Least Concern (IUCN 3.1)

Scientific classification
- Kingdom: Animalia
- Phylum: Chordata
- Class: Mammalia
- Order: Rodentia
- Family: Dasyproctidae
- Genus: Myoprocta
- Species: M. pratti

Binomial name
- Myoprocta pratti Pocock, 1913

= Green acouchi =

Species of rodent

The green acouchi (Myoprocta pratti) is a species of rodent in the acouchi genus, part of the family Dasyproctidae. It is found in western Amazonia, west of the Rios Negro and Madeira, in northwestern Brazil, northeastern Peru, eastern Ecuador, southeastern Colombia, and southern Venezuela. There is substantial variation within this range, and the Green Acouchi, as currently recognized, may contain more than one species. Because the application of the scientific name acouchy, currently in use for the Red Acouchi, has historically been disputed, the name Myoprocta acouchy has sometimes been used for this species instead of Myoprocta pratti. The species is named for Antwerp Edgar Pratt who was a British naturalist.

== Description ==
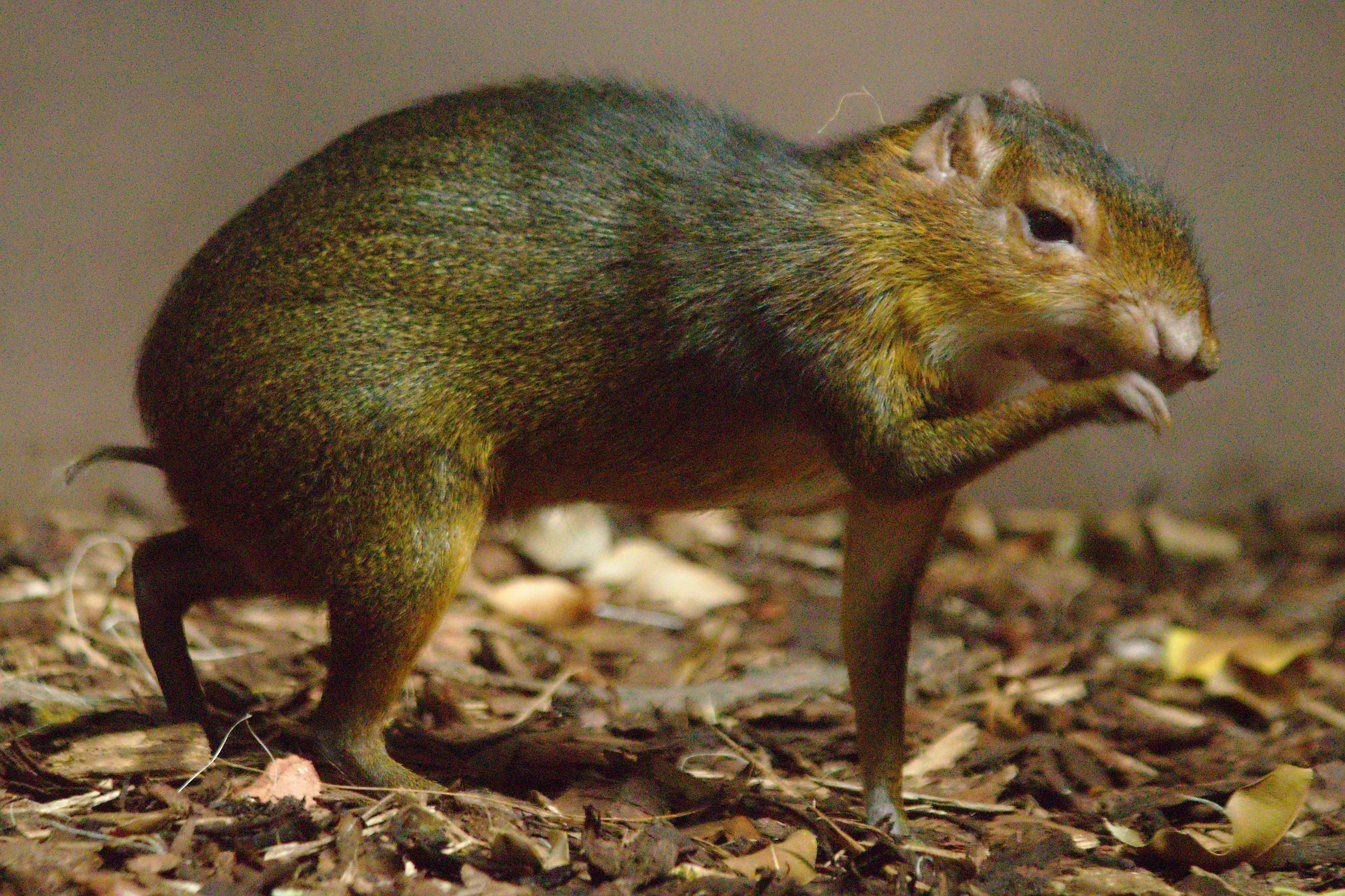
Green acouchi at Schönbrunn Zoo

An adult green acouchi weighs around 1 kilogram (2.2 lb), and has a short tail. The acouchi is a frugivore and so is prone to the dental disease caries.

== Behavior ==
Green acouchis are diurnal, surface dwelling rodents and have a complex array of behavior patterns relating to social interaction. In addition, they are food hoarders, employing a scatter hoarding strategy.

== Reproduction ==
Female acouchis have an average oestrus cycle length of around 43 days and have a set breeding season between autumn-spring with a 99-day gestation. Females produce small litters of relatively precocial young, mothers produce a 'purring' vocalisation to maintain contact with young. Unusually pregnant acouchis do not specifically nest build but will instead choose a preferred nest site for the first week of lactation. Mothers can become very aggressive after parturition and raise their litters in isolation; weaning is extended and young remain with the mother for several weeks or months post-weaning to benefit from the mother's protection.
