= Kalinowski's agouti =

Conservation status
- Data Deficient (IUCN 3.1)

Scientific classification
- Kingdom: Animalia
- Phylum: Chordata
- Class: Mammalia
- Infraclass: Placentalia
- Order: Rodentia
- Family: Dasyproctidae
- Genus: Dasyprocta
- Species: D. kalinowskii

Binomial name
- Dasyprocta kalinowskii Thomas, 1897

Species of rodent

Kalinowski's agouti (Dasyprocta kalinowskii) is a species of rodent in the family Dasyproctidae. It is endemic to southeast Peru. It occurs at elevations of up to 3,080 metres (10,100 ft) asl.

It is threatened by habitat loss.
