= Orinoco agouti =

Conservation status
- Near Threatened (IUCN 3.1)

Scientific classification
- Kingdom: Animalia
- Phylum: Chordata
- Class: Mammalia
- Order: Rodentia
- Family: Dasyproctidae
- Genus: Dasyprocta
- Species: D. guamara

Binomial name
- Dasyprocta guamara Ojasti, 1972

Species of rodent

The Orinoco agouti (Dasyprocta guamara) is a species of rodent in the family Dasyproctidae. It is endemic to Delta Amacuro in Venezuela, where it is found in areas with rainforest or mangroves.
