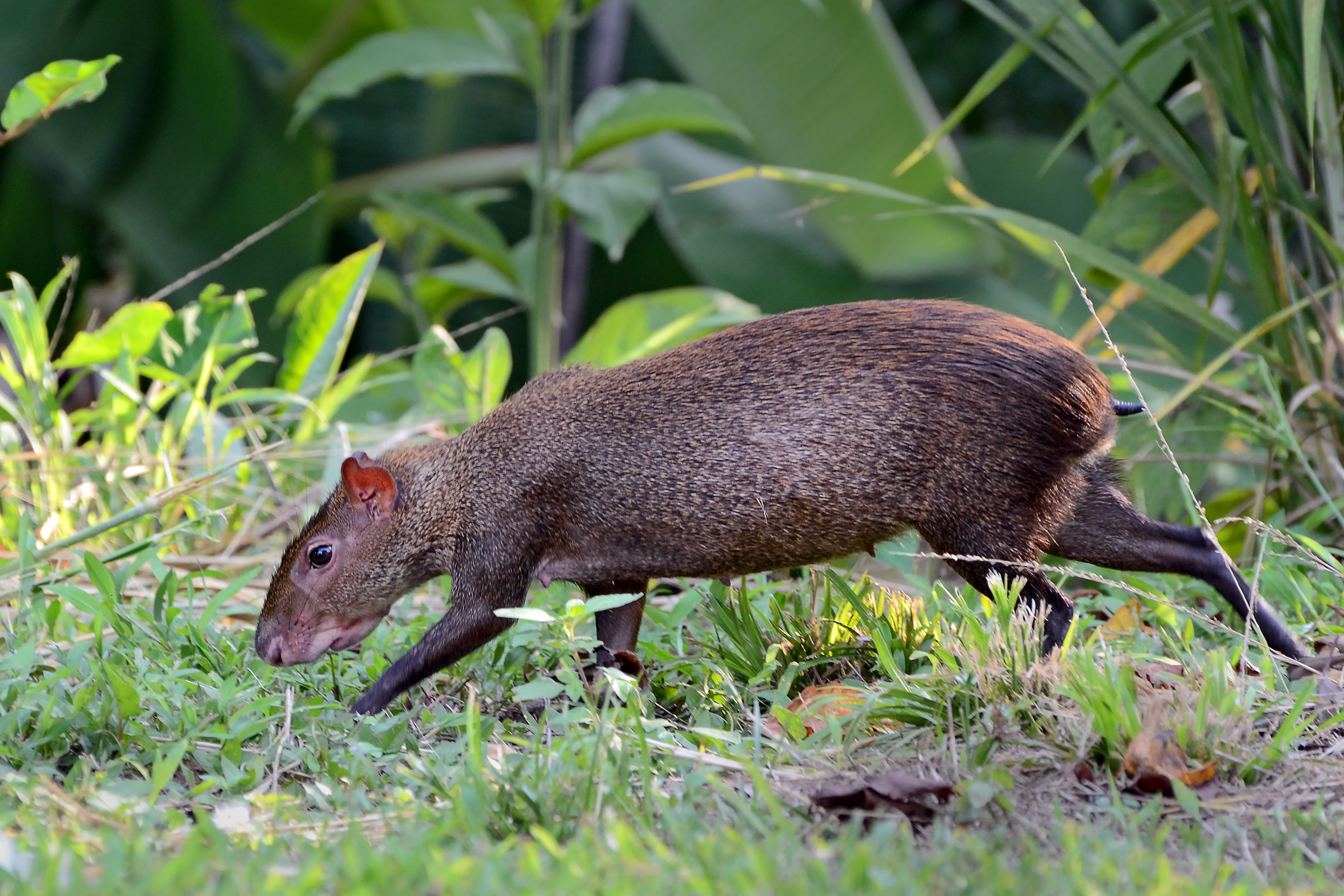
- Central American agouti, D. punctata

Scientific classification
- Kingdom: Animalia
- Phylum: Chordata
- Class: Mammalia
- Order: Rodentia
- Superfamily: Cavioidea
- Family: Dasyproctidae; Gray 1825

Type genus
- Dasyprocta Illiger, 1811

Genera
- See text
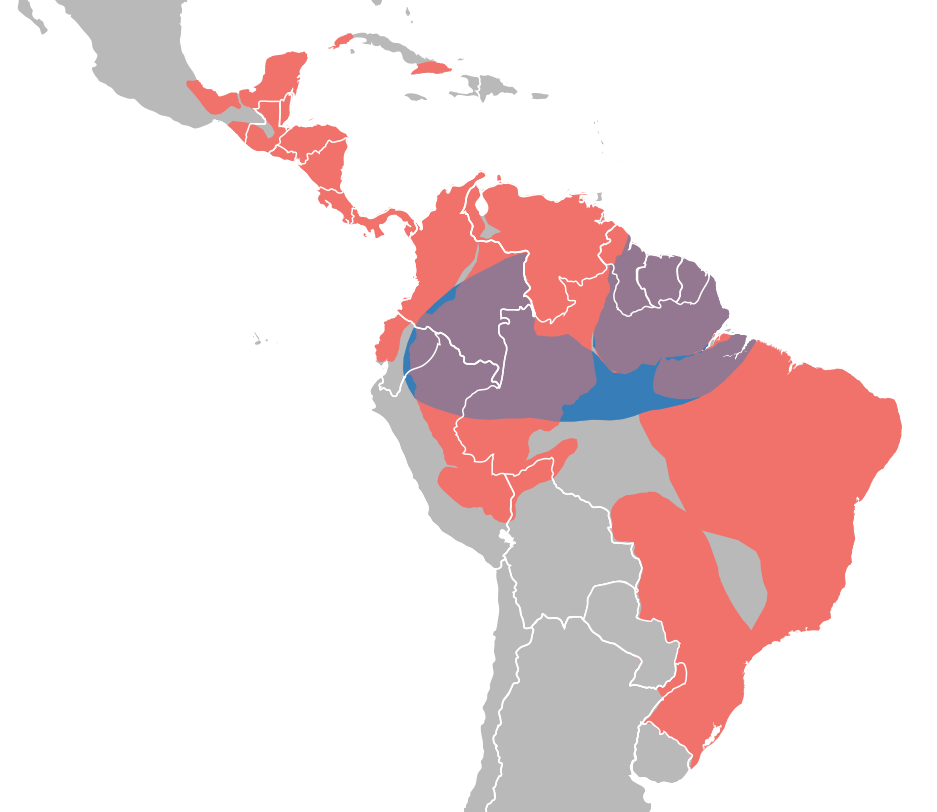
- Dasyproctidae distribution. Dasyprocta in red; Myoprocta in blue (darker where ranges overlap)

= Dasyproctidae =

Dasyproctidae Temporal range: Late Oligocene (Deseadan)-Recent ~23–0 Ma

Family of rodents

Dasyproctidae (from Ancient Greek δασύς (dasús), meaning "hairy", and πρωκτός (prōktós), meaning "anus") is a family of large South American rodents, comprising the agoutis and acouchis. Their fur is a reddish or dark colour above, with a paler underside. They are herbivorous, often feeding on ripe fruit that falls from trees. They live in burrows, and, like squirrels, will bury some of their food for later use.

Dasyproctids exist in Central and South America, which are the tropical parts of the New World. The fossil record of this family can be traced back to the Late Oligocene (Deseadan in the SALMA classification).

As with all rodents, members of this family have incisors, pre-molars, and molars, but no canines. The cheek teeth are hypsodont and flat-crowned.

== Classification ==
Fossil taxa follow McKenna and Bell, with modifications following Kramarz.

- Family Dasyproctidae
  - Genus †Alloiomys
  - Genus †Australoprocta
  - Genus †Branisamys
  - Genus †Incamys
  - Genus †Neoreomys
  - Genus †Megastus
  - Genus †Palmiramys
  - Genus Dasyprocta
    - Azara's agouti, D. azarae
    - Coiban agouti, D. coibae
    - Orange agouti, D. croconota
    - Black agouti, D. fuliginosa
    - Orinoco agouti, D. guamara
    - Iack's agouti, D. iacki
    - Kalinowski's agouti, D. kalinowskii
    - Red-rumped agouti, D. leporina
    - Mexican agouti, D. mexicana
    - Black-rumped agouti, D. prymnolopha
    - Central American agouti, D. punctata
    - Ruatan Island agouti, D. ruatanica
    - Brown agouti, D. variegata
  - Genus Myoprocta
    - Green acouchi, M. pratti
    - Red acouchi, M. acouchy

The pacas (genus Cuniculus) are placed by some authorities in Dasyproctidae, but molecular studies have demonstrated they do not form a monophyletic group.
