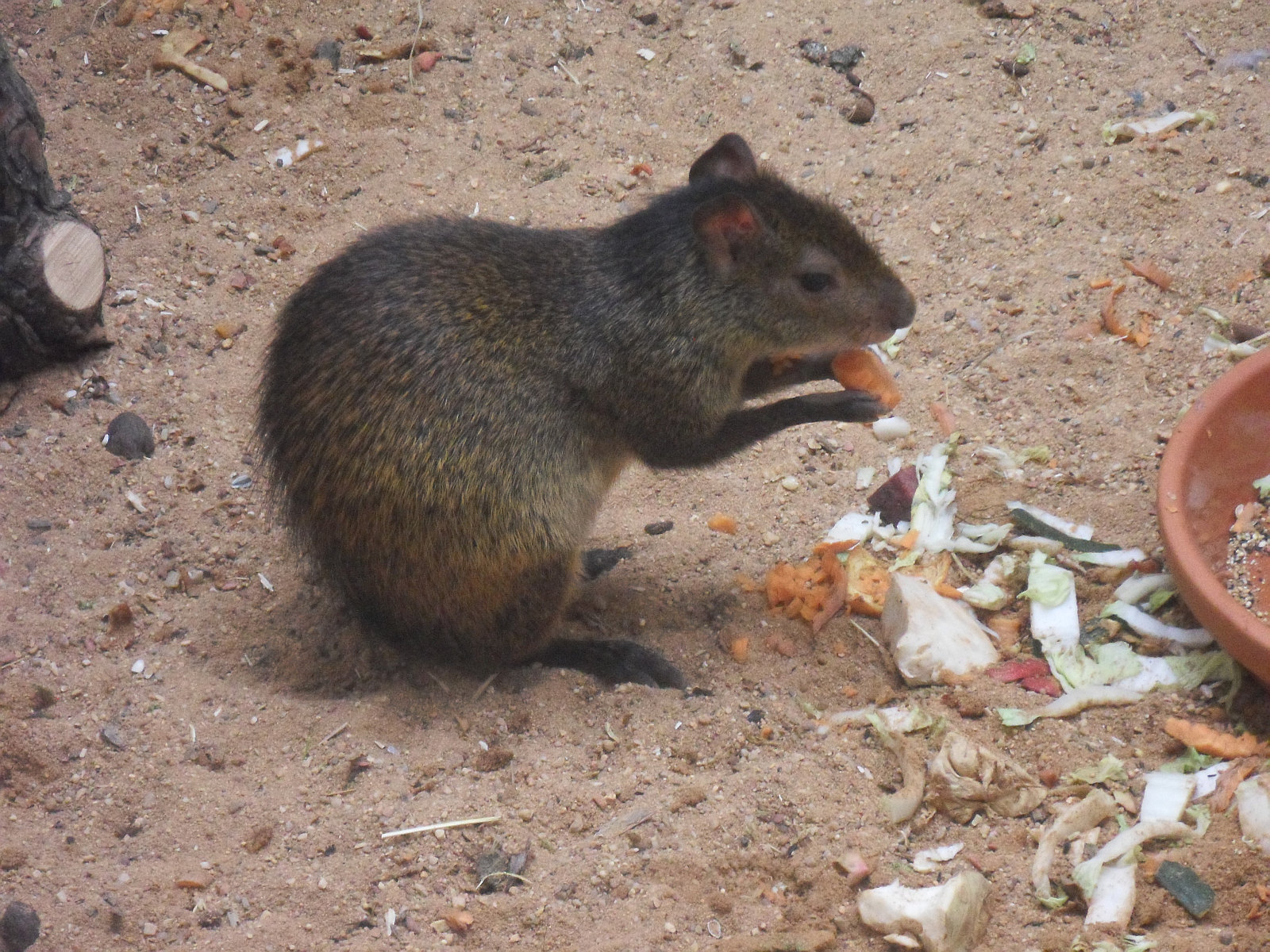

Conservation status
- Least Concern (IUCN 3.1)

Scientific classification
- Kingdom: Animalia
- Phylum: Chordata
- Class: Mammalia
- Order: Rodentia
- Family: Dasyproctidae
- Genus: Dasyprocta
- Species: D. prymnolopha

Binomial name
- Dasyprocta prymnolopha Wagler, 1831
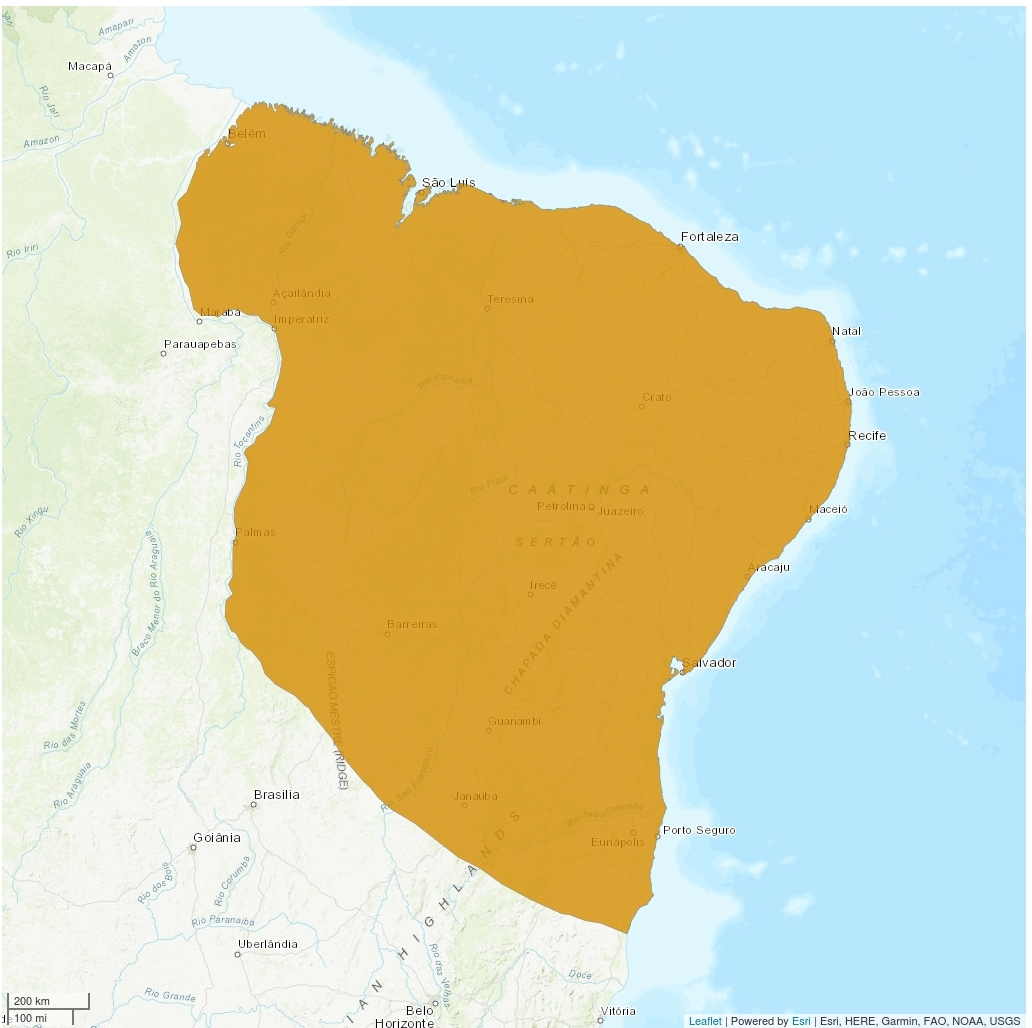

= Black-rumped agouti =

Species of rodent

The black-rumped agouti (Dasyprocta prymnolopha) is an agouti species from the family Dasyproctidae. It is endemic to Brazil, and its range roughly equals the Northeast Region. It is named after its black rump which contrasts clearly with the orange body.
