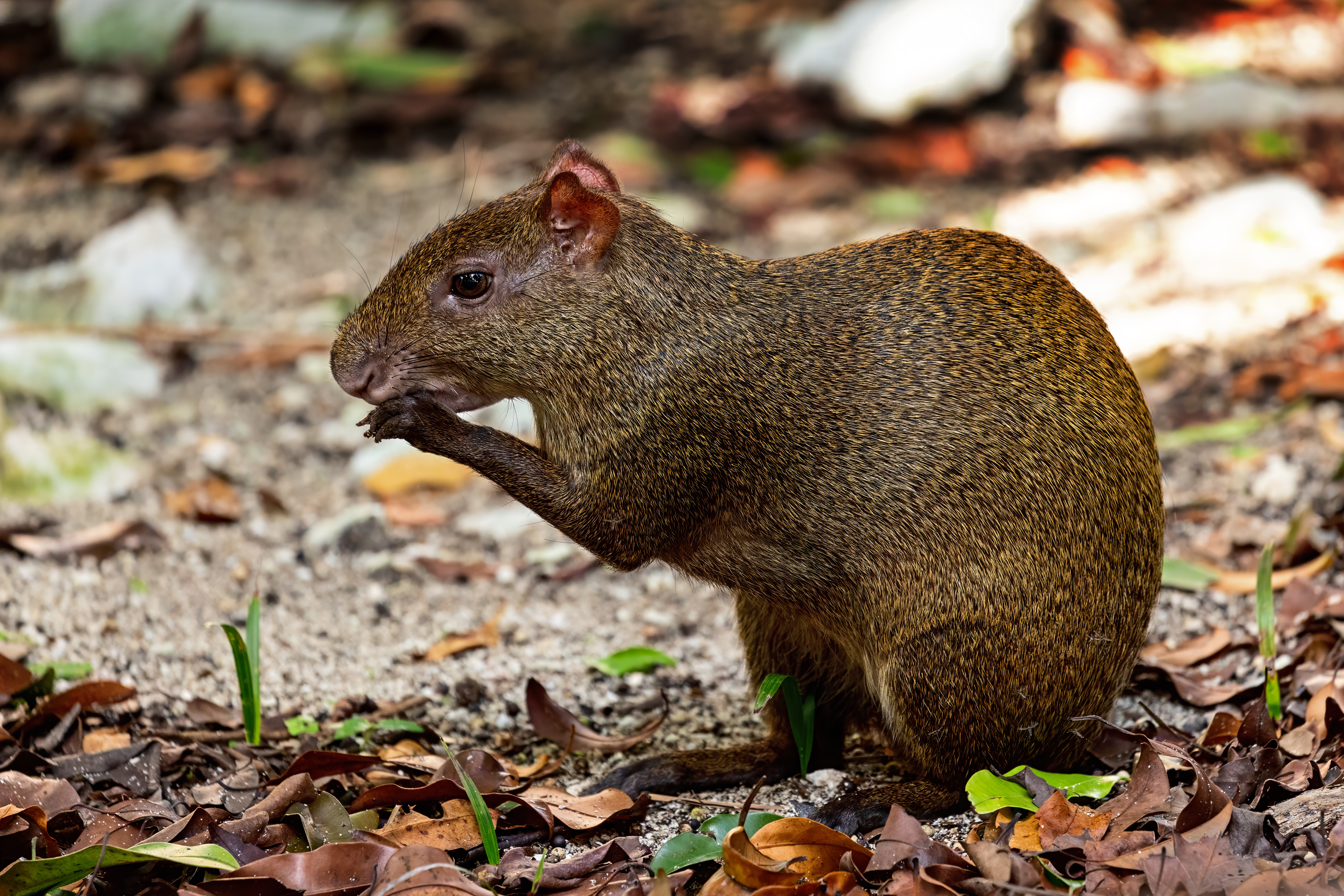
- Central American agouti (Dasyprocta punctata) in Tulum, Mexico.

Scientific classification
- Kingdom: Animalia
- Phylum: Chordata
- Class: Mammalia
- Order: Rodentia
- Family: Dasyproctidae
- Genus: Dasyprocta; Illiger, 1811

Type species
- Mus aguti Linnaeus, 1766 (=Mus leporinus Linnaeus, 1758)

Species
- See text
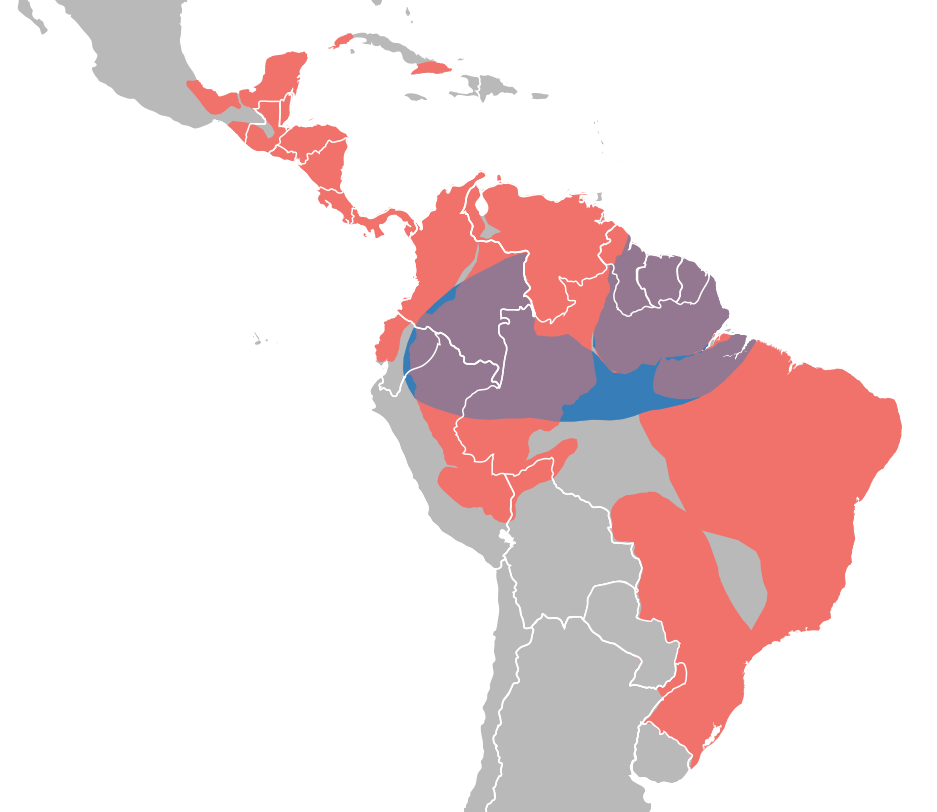
- Dasyproctidae distribution. Dasyprocta in red; Myoprocta in blue (darker where ranges overlap)

= Agouti =

Genus of mammals

The agouti (/əˈɡuːtiː/, ə-GOO-tee) or common agouti is any of several rodent species of the genus Dasyprocta, from Ancient Greek δασύς (dasús), meaning "hair", and πρωκτός (prōktós), meaning "anus". They are native to Central America, northern and central South America, and the southern Lesser Antilles. Some species have also been introduced elsewhere in the West Indies and in west Africa (Bénin). They are related to guinea pigs and look quite similar, but they are larger and have longer legs. The species vary considerably in colour, being brown, reddish, dull orange, greyish, or blackish, but typically with lighter underparts. Their bodies are covered with coarse hair, which is raised when alarmed.

The related pacas were formerly included in genus Agouti, but these animals were reclassified in 1998 as genus Cuniculus.

The Spanish term is agutí. In Mexico, the agouti is called the sereque. In Panama, it is known as the ñeque and in eastern Ecuador, as the guatusa.

== Etymology ==
The name agouti is derived from either Guarani or Tupi, both South American indigenous languages, in which the name is written as akuti. The Portuguese term for these animals, cutia, is derived from this original naming.

== Description ==
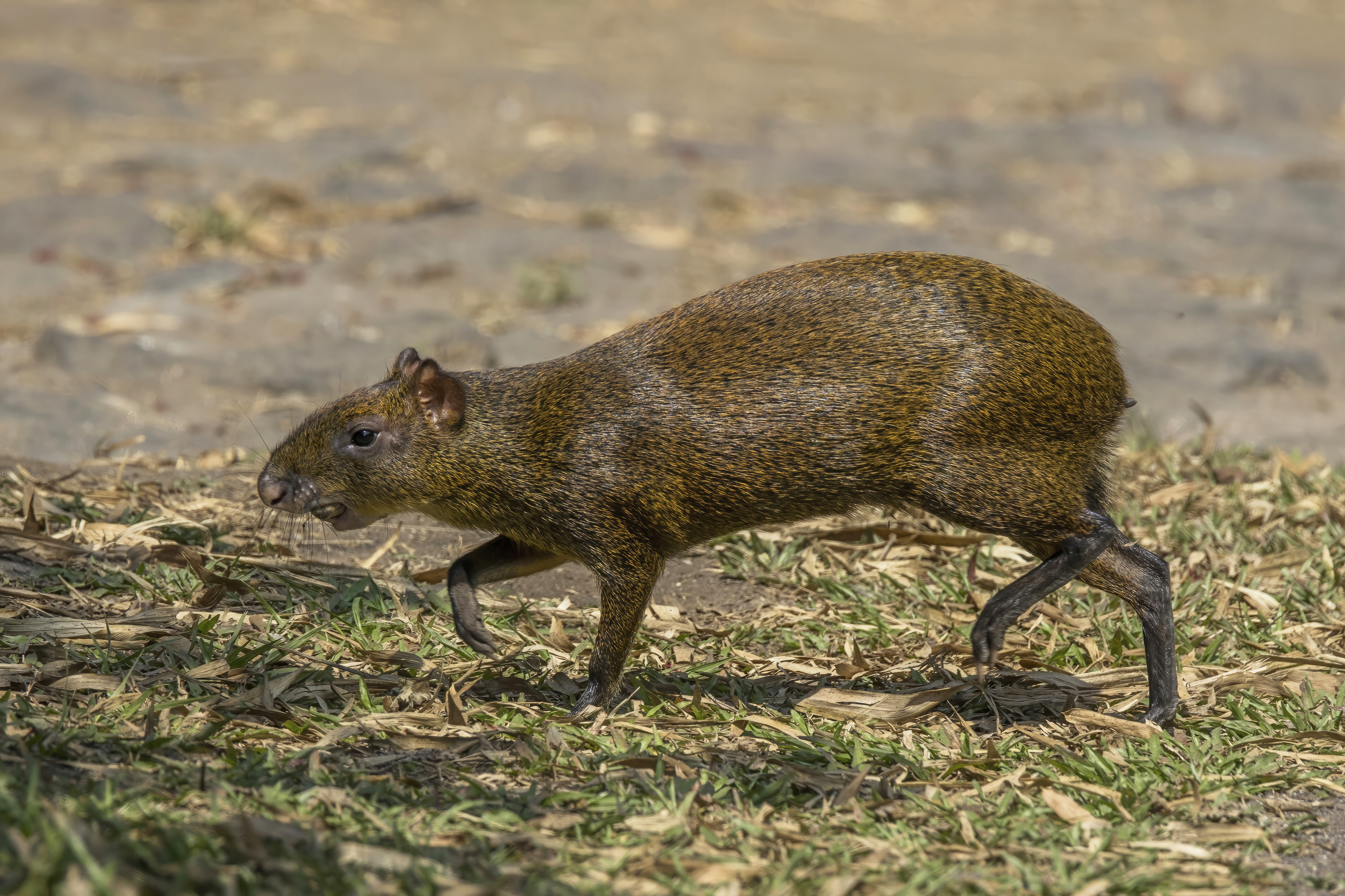
A Central American agouti with food

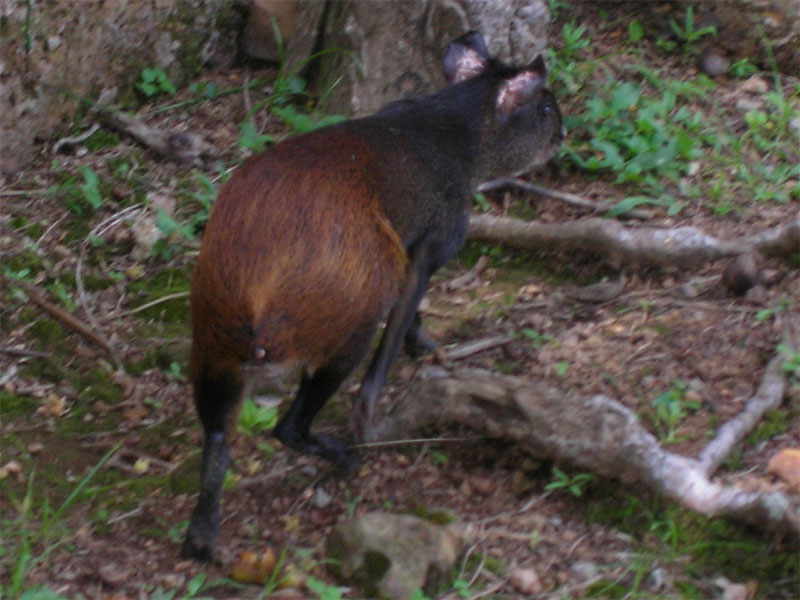
Red-rumped agouti (Dasyprocta leporina)

Agoutis have five toes on their front feet and three toes on their hind feet; the first toe is very small. The tail is very short or nonexistent and hairless. The molar teeth have cylindrical crowns, with several islands and a single lateral fold of enamel. They weigh 2.4–6 kg (5.3–13.2 lb) and are 40.5–76 cm (15.9–29.9 in) in length, with short, hairless tails. Most species are brown on their backs and whitish or buff on their bellies; the fur may have a glossy appearance and then glimmers in an orange colour. Reports differ as to whether they are diurnal or nocturnal animals.

=== Behaviour and habits ===
In the wild, agoutis are shy animals and flee from humans, while in captivity they may become trusting. In Trinidad, they are renowned for being very fast runners, able to keep hunting dogs occupied with chasing them for hours.

Agoutis are found in forested and wooded areas in Central and South America. Their habitats include rainforests, savannas, and cultivated fields. They conceal themselves at night in hollow tree trunks or in burrows among roots. Active and graceful in their movements, their pace is either a kind of trot or a series of springs following one another so rapidly as to look like a gallop. They take readily to water, in which they swim well.

When feeding, agoutis sit on their hind legs and hold food between their forepaws. They may gather in groups of up to 100 to feed. They eat fallen fruit, leaves and roots, although they may sometimes climb trees to eat green fruit. They hoard food in small, buried stores. They sometimes eat the eggs of ground-nesting birds and even shellfish on the seashore. They may cause damage to sugarcane and banana plantations. They are regarded as one of the few species (along with macaws) that can open Brazil nuts without tools, mainly thanks to their strength and exceptionally sharp teeth. In southern Brazil, their main source of energy is the nut of Araucaria angustifolia.

== Breeding ==
Agoutis give birth to litters of two to four young (pups) after a gestation period of three months. Some species have two litters a year in May and October, while others breed year round. The pups are born in burrows lined with leaves, roots and hair. They are well developed at birth and may be up and eating within an hour. Fathers are barred from the nest while the young are very small, but the parents pair bond for the rest of their lives. They can live for as long as 20 years, a remarkably long time for a rodent.

== Species ==
- Azara's agouti, Dasyprocta azarae
- Coiban agouti, Dasyprocta coibae
- Orange agouti, Dasyprocta croconota
- Black agouti, Dasyprocta fuliginosa
- Orinoco agouti, Dasyprocta guamara
- Iack's agouti, Dasyprocta iacki
- Kalinowski's agouti, Dasyprocta kalinowskii
- Red-rumped agouti, Dasyprocta leporina
- Mexican agouti, Dasyprocta mexicana
- Black-rumped agouti, Dasyprocta prymnolopha
- Central American agouti, Dasyprocta punctata
- Ruatan Island agouti, Dasyprocta ruatanica
- Brown agouti, Dasyprocta variegata

== See also ==
- Paca
- Lowland paca
