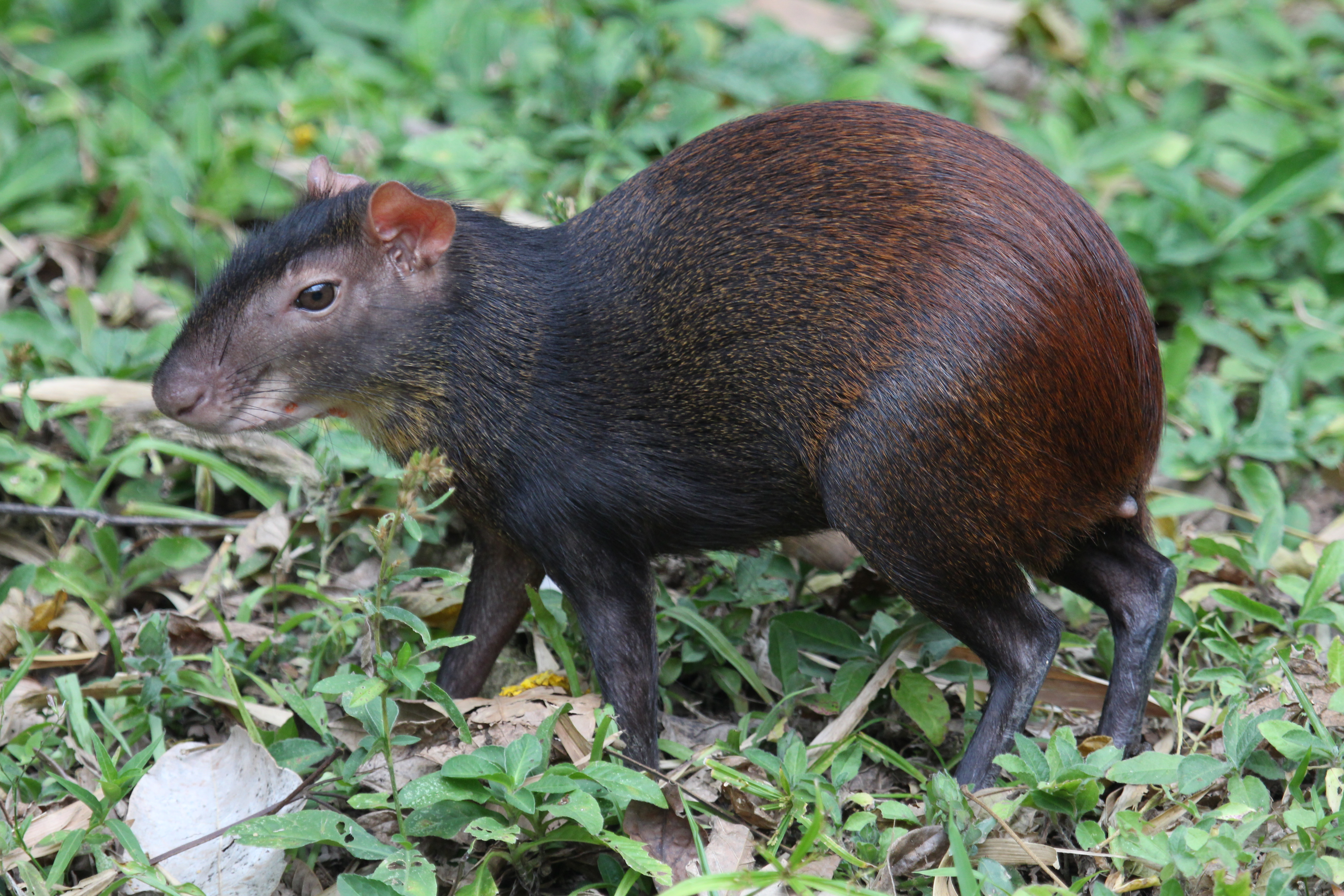

Conservation status
- Least Concern (IUCN 3.1)

Scientific classification
- Kingdom: Animalia
- Phylum: Chordata
- Class: Mammalia
- Order: Rodentia
- Family: Dasyproctidae
- Genus: Dasyprocta
- Species: D. leporina

Binomial name
- Dasyprocta leporina (Linnaeus, 1758)
- Geographic range

Synonyms
- Mus aguti Linnaeus, 1766; Mus leporinus Linnaeus, 1758

= Red-rumped agouti =

Species of rodent

The red-rumped agouti (Dasyprocta leporina), also known as the golden-rumped agouti, orange-rumped agouti or Brazilian agouti, is a species of agouti from the family Dasyproctidae.

== Distribution ==
It is native to northeastern South America, mainly in Venezuela, Guyana, Suriname, French Guiana, northeastern Brazil, Trinidad and Tobago and Saint Lucia in the Caribbean. It has also been introduced to Florida, the U.S. Virgin Islands, Grenada, and Dominica.

== Names ==
Despite the alternative name Brazilian agouti, it is neither the only nor the most widespread species of agouti in Brazil. In Brazil all agoutis are often called "cutia" [kuˈtʃiɐ].

== Habitat ==
It is found in a wide range of forests, including rainforest and secondary forest.

== Description ==
Female individual feeding its progeny.

The red-rumped agouti weighs about 3 to 6 kilograms (6.6 to 13.2 lb). It is about 48 to 64 cm (19 to 25 in) long. The females are larger than males but otherwise look similar. It is brownish with darker spots on the upper body. The fur becomes more orange as it goes past (going down) the middle area of the animal. The ears are somewhat square in shape. The front feet have four toes and the back have three each. It can be distinguished from other agoutis by their distinct coloring.

It has no distinct breeding season, but females come into season twice a year and generally have one to four young. The gestation period is 104 to 120 days. On average, it takes 20 weeks for the young to be weaned. It lives in pairs or family groups of the parents and babies. It needs large areas for food, breeding, and territory; because of this, keeping it in captivity is difficult. It lives 15-20 yrs in captivity.

== Diet ==
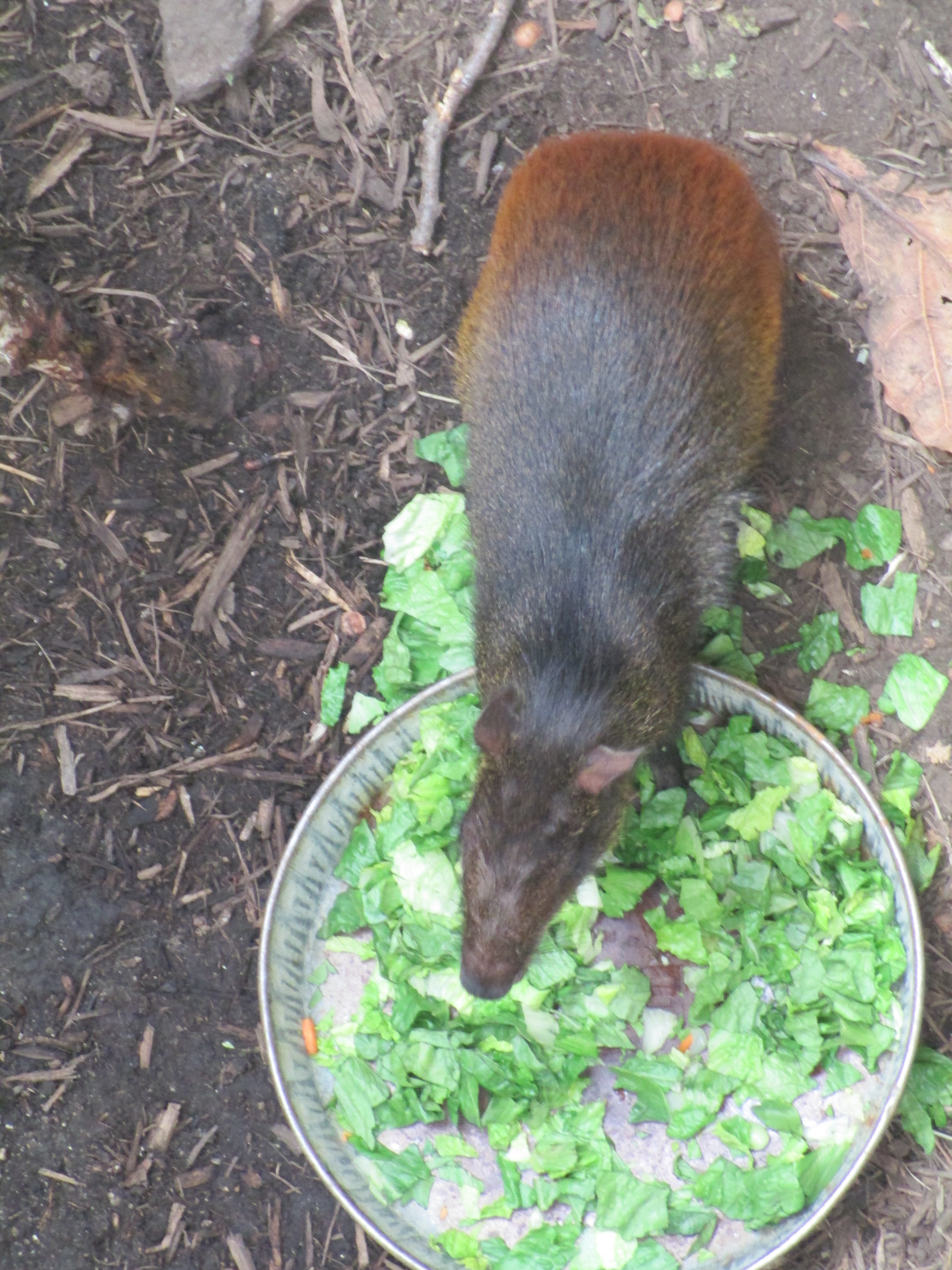
Captive specimen at Henry Vilas Zoo in the United States

Food mostly consists of seeds, pulp, leaves, roots and fruits. It also feeds on insect larvae when plant resources are low. It is known to feed on and disperse Astrocaryum aculeatissimum seeds, as well as Hymenaea courbaril seeds.
