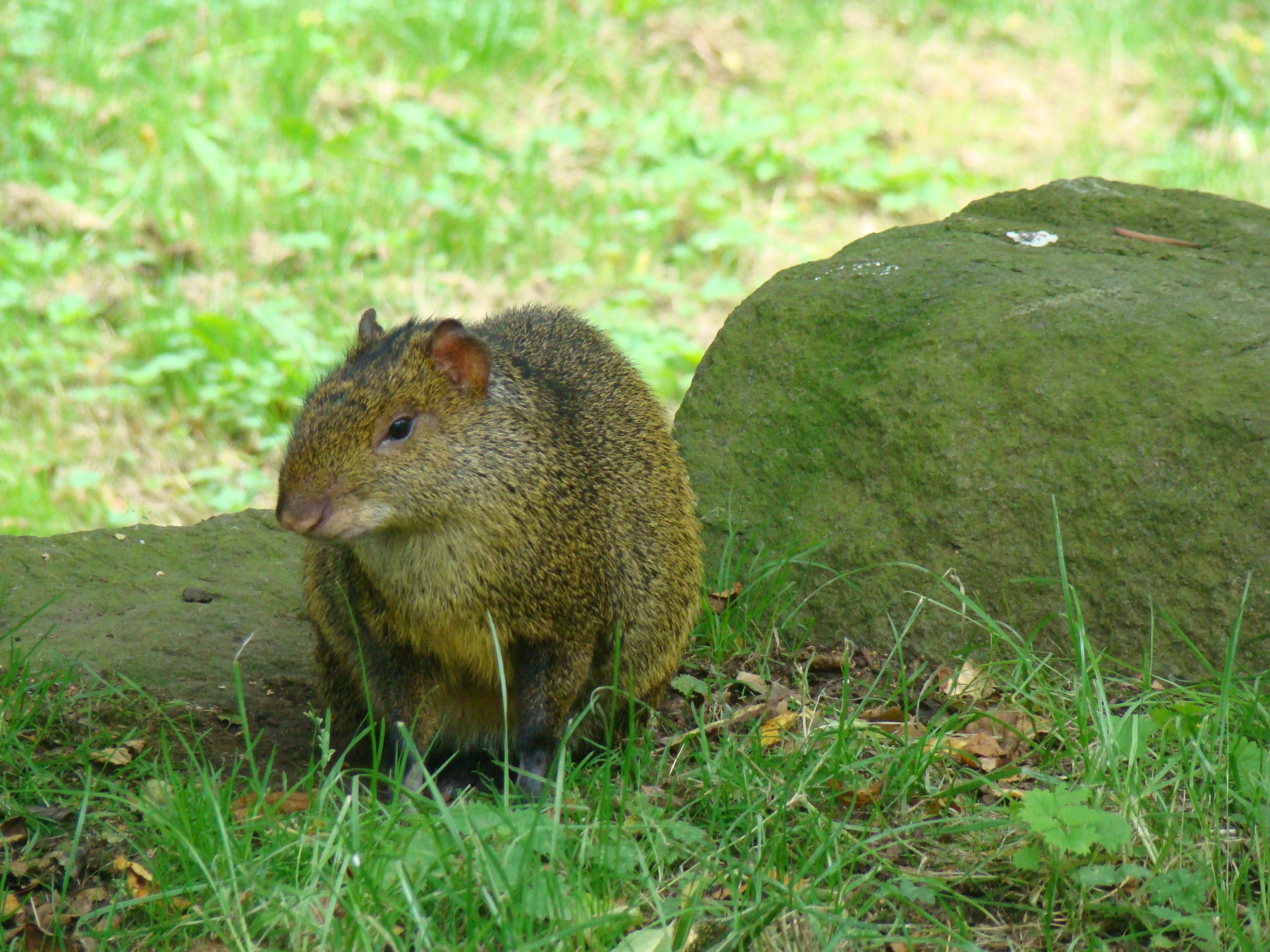

Conservation status
- Data Deficient (IUCN 3.1)

Scientific classification
- Kingdom: Animalia
- Phylum: Chordata
- Class: Mammalia
- Order: Rodentia
- Family: Dasyproctidae
- Genus: Dasyprocta
- Species: D. azarae

Binomial name
- Dasyprocta azarae Lichtenstein, 1823

= Azara's agouti =

Species of rodent

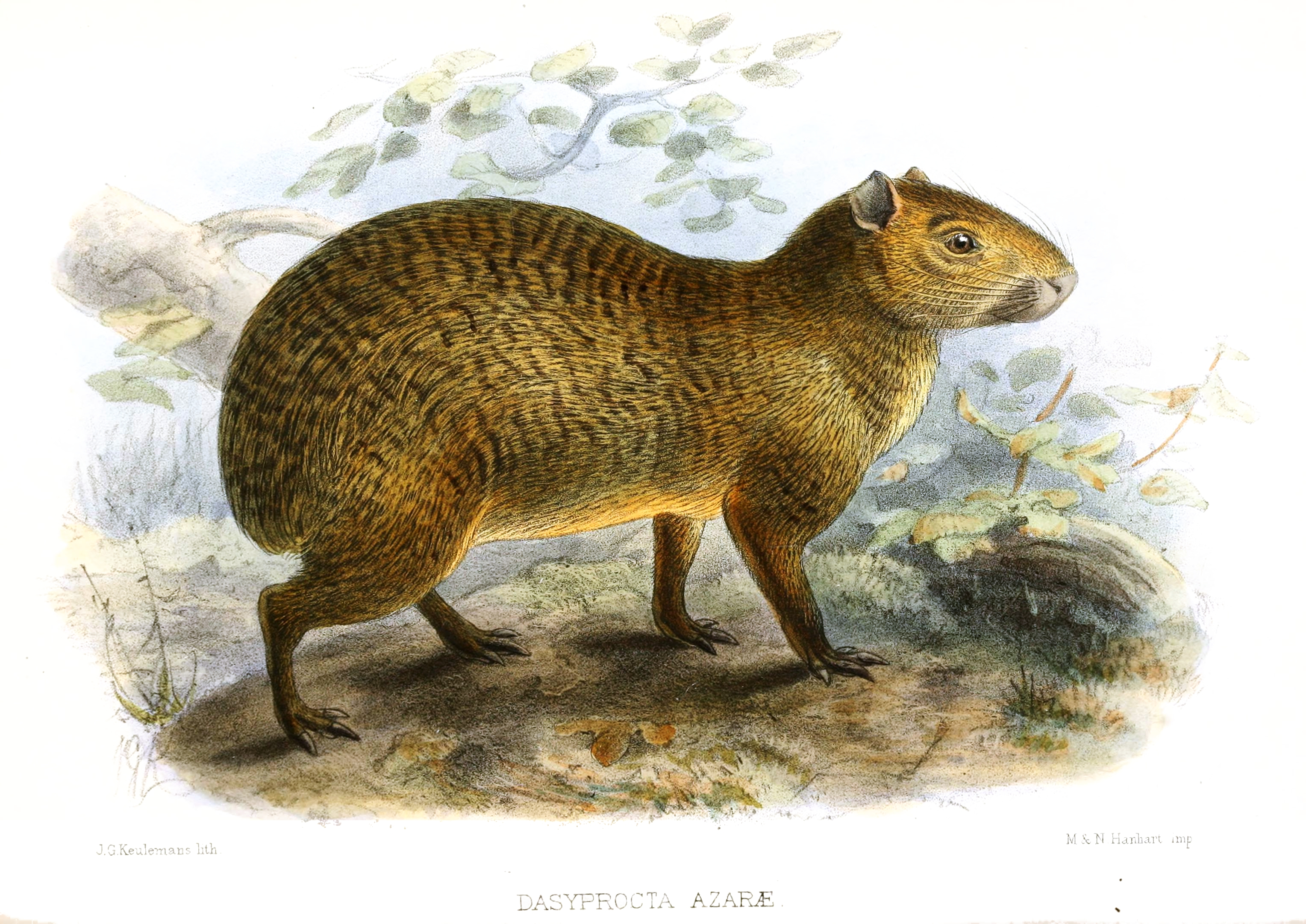

Azara's agouti (Dasyprocta azarae) is an agouti species from the family Dasyproctidae. Found in Brazil, Paraguay, and Argentina, it is named after Spanish naturalist Félix de Azara. The population is unknown and may have gone locally extinct in some areas due to hunting; it is listed as vulnerable in Argentina.

== Behaviour ==
Despite being active during the day, Azara's agoutis are quite difficult to study, as they are naturally extremely shy and will flee and hide when humans approach. Their shyness may be related to their solitary lifestyles, but may be because they are heavily preyed upon by many carnivorous species, including humans. However, if bred in captivity, they can become trusting animals. Azara's agoutis will let out little barks when alarmed. These animals are sometimes known as "jungle gardeners", as they often bury nuts and seeds and forget where they put them, therefore helping new plants to grow.
