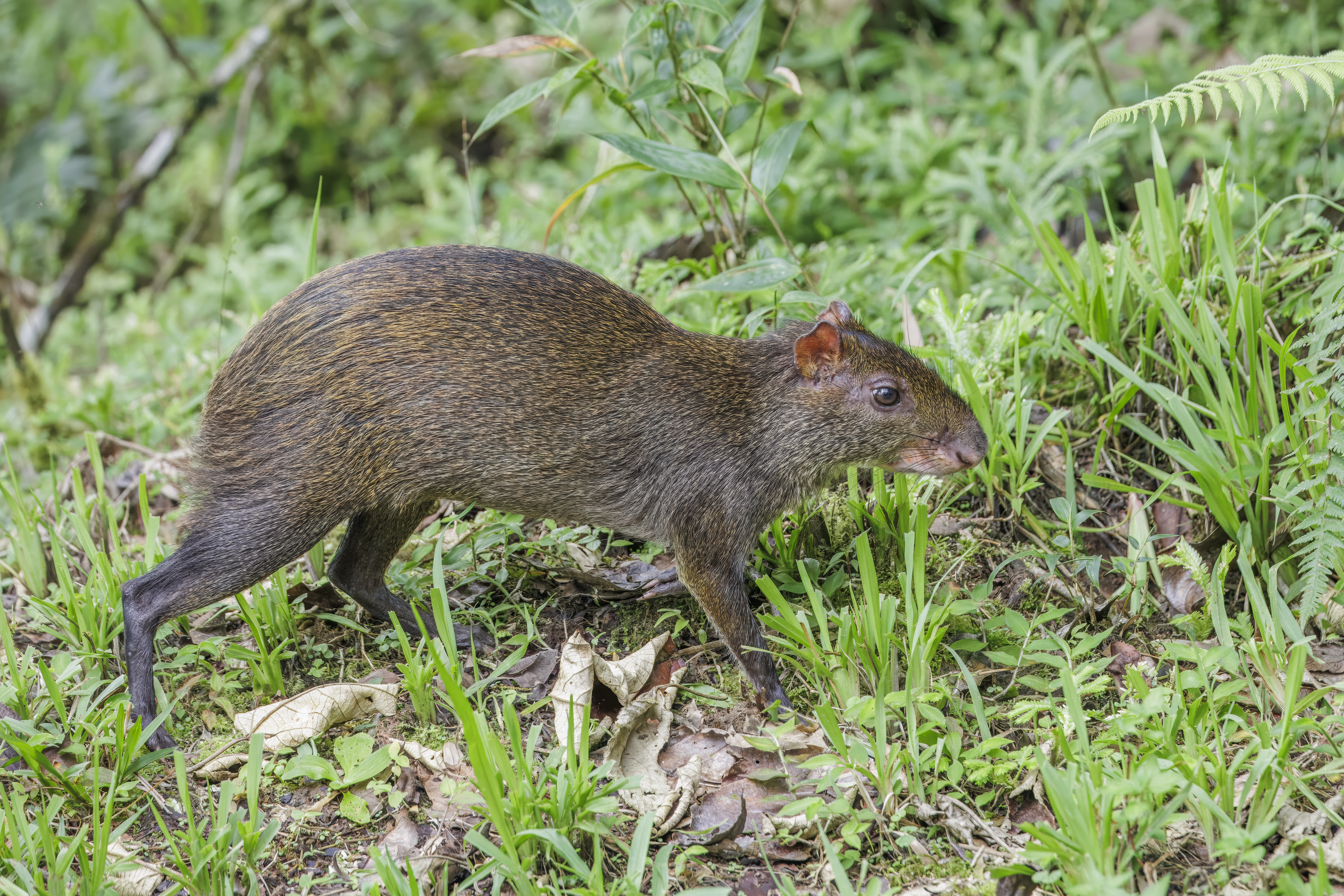
- in Ecuador

Conservation status
- Least Concern (IUCN 3.1)
- CITES Appendix III

Scientific classification
- Kingdom: Animalia
- Phylum: Chordata
- Class: Mammalia
- Order: Rodentia
- Family: Dasyproctidae
- Genus: Dasyprocta
- Species: D. punctata

Binomial name
- Dasyprocta punctata J. E. Gray, 1842

= Central American agouti =

Species of rodent

The Central American agouti (Dasyprocta punctata) is a species of agouti from the family Dasyproctidae. The main portion of its range is from Chiapas and the Yucatan Peninsula (southern Mexico), through Central America, to northwestern Ecuador, Colombia and far western Venezuela. A highly disjunct population is found in southeastern Peru, far southwestern Brazil, Bolivia, western Paraguay and far northwestern Argentina. The disjunct population has been treated as a separate species, the brown agouti (Dasyprocta variegata), but a major review of the geographic variation is necessary. The Central American agouti has also been introduced to Cuba and the Cayman Islands.

Though some populations are reduced due to hunting and deforestation, large populations remain and it is not considered threatened.

In an analysis of 240 species, agoutis came in fourth place for best sense of smell; better than dogs, which actually came out average. Their snouts are packed full of olfactory receptors.

== Appearance ==
Central American agoutis from the main part of their range weigh 3–4.2 kg (6.6–9.3 lb) and are typically reddish, orange or yellowish grizzled with black. In northern Colombia, western Venezuela, and on the Atlantic slope of Costa Rica and Panama the foreparts are brownish or blackish grizzled with tawny or olivaceous, the mid-body is orange, and the rump is black or cream. In western Colombia and Ecuador some have tawny foreparts and yellowish to the rump. Agoutis from the disjunct southern population (Peru, Brazil, Bolivia, Paraguay and Argentina) which sometimes are treated as a separate species, Dasyprocta variegata, weigh 3–5.2 kg (6.6–11.5 lb) and are grizzled brown, yellowish and black, or grizzled black and orange.

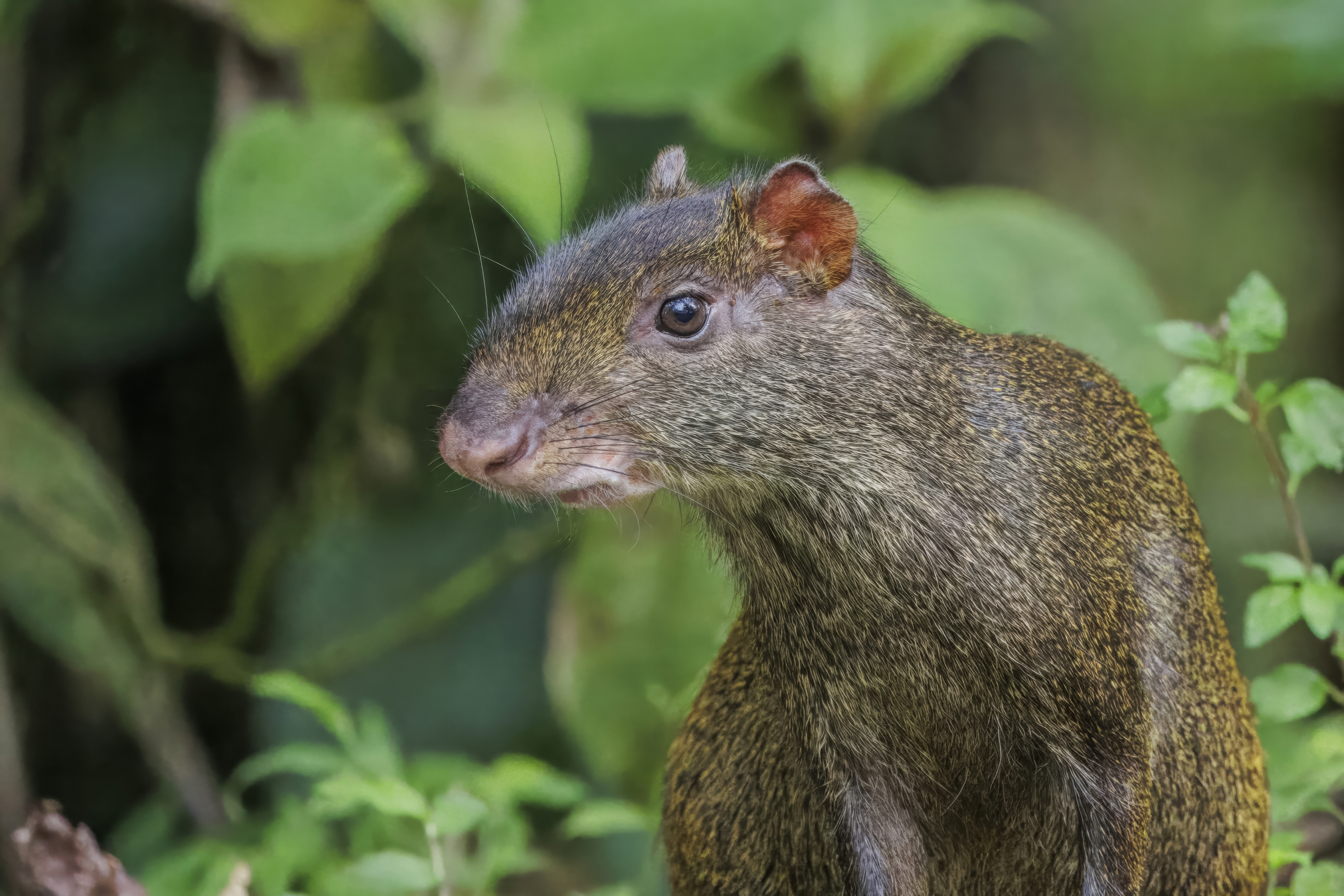
in Ecuador

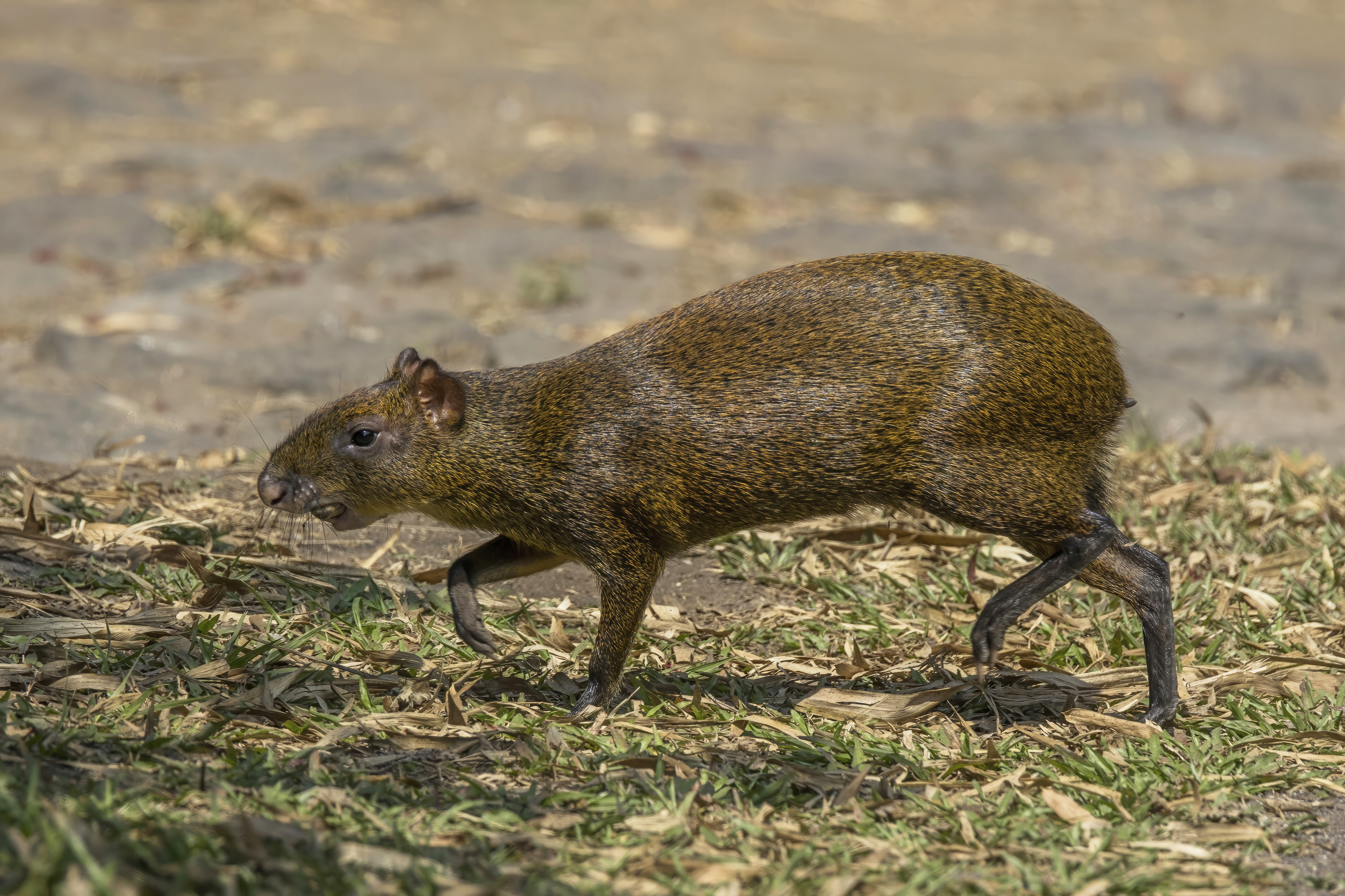
in Guatemala

searching for food

== Behavior ==
Like other agoutis, Central American agoutis are diurnal and live in monogamous pairs. They mainly feed on fruits and seeds, and are important seed dispersers.

The Central American agoutis mainly eat fruit and search for fruit-bearing trees. They can hear the sound of falling fruit from far away. When food is abundant, they store seeds. They sometimes also look for and eat crabs, vegetables, and other plants.
