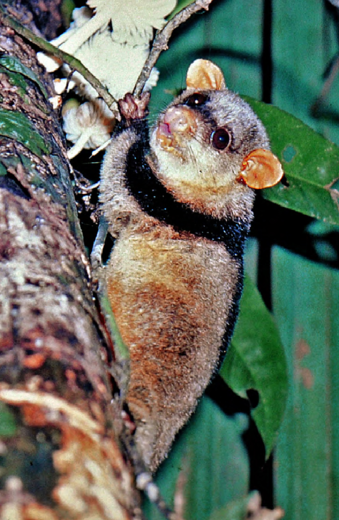
- Black-shouldered opossum at Parque Estadual de Guajará-Mirím

Conservation status
- Least Concern (IUCN 3.1)

Scientific classification
- Kingdom: Animalia
- Phylum: Chordata
- Class: Mammalia
- Infraclass: Marsupialia
- Order: Didelphimorphia
- Family: Didelphidae
- Subfamily: Caluromyinae
- Genus: Caluromysiops; Sanborn, 1951
- Species: C. irrupta

Binomial name
- Caluromysiops irrupta Sanborn, 1951
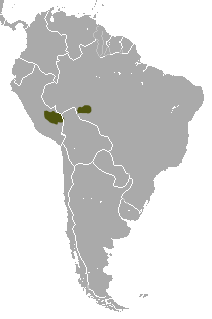
- Black-shouldered opossum range

= Black-shouldered opossum =

Species of marsupial

The black-shouldered opossum (Caluromysiops irrupta), also known as the white-eared opossum, is an opossum known from western Brazil and southeastern Peru. It was first described by Colin Campbell Sanborn, curator of Field Museum of Natural History, in 1951. The black-shouldered opossum is characterized by a gray coat, gray underbelly, and broad black stripes that extend from the forefeet, meet on the shoulders, run along the midline of the back and then split into parallel stripes that run down the hind feet. Little is known of the behavior of the black-shouldered opossum. It is nocturnal and arboreal. It is known to feed on fruits and rodents. The opossum inhabits humid forests. The IUCN classifies it as least concern.

== Taxonomy ==
The black-shouldered opossum is the sole member of Caluromysiops, and is placed in the family Didelphidae. No subspecies are recognized.

The cladogram below, based on a 2016 study, shows the phylogenetic relationships of the brown-eared woolly opossum.

- - - Bushy-tailed opossum (Glironia venusta)
    - Caluromyinae
      - Black-shouldered opossum (Caluromysiops irrupta)
      - - Derby's woolly opossum (Caluromys derbianus)
        - - Bare-tailed woolly opossum (Caluromys philander)
          - Brown-eared woolly opossum (Caluromys lanatus)
  - - Kalinowski's mouse opossum (Hyladelphys kalinowskii)
    - - Marmosini
      - - Didelphini
        - Thylamyini

== Description ==
The black-shouldered opossum is characterized by a gray coat, gray underbelly with buff-tipped hairs, and broad black stripes that extend from the forefeet, meet on the shoulders, run along the midline of the back and then split into parallel stripes that run down the hindfeet. Indistinct dark lines run through the eyes. 60 to 75 percent of the length of the tail is darker than the coat dorsally (on the back), while the rest is white. Except for the last 75 percent of the length at the base, the tail is bushy. Like Caluromys species, its fur is soft, thick and woolly, and has a similar skull. However, it differs from them in having a shorter rostrum and larger molars. The head-and-body length is between 25 and 33 centimetres (9.8 and 13.0 in) and the tail measures 31–40 centimetres (12–16 in). The hindfeet measure 6.7 centimetres (2.6 in), while the ears 3.7 centimetres (1.5 in).

== Ecology and behavior ==
The black-shouldered opossum's behavior is not well documented. It is nocturnal and arboreal. It spends a significant amount of time in trees, mainly on high branches. Studies suggest individual diet preferences; the opossums feed on rodents as well as fruits. Lifespan in captivity has been known to exceed seven years. Up to two young have been recorded.

== Distribution and status ==
The black-shouldered opossum occurs in humid forests of western Brazil and southeastern Peru, and probably in Bolivia as well. There are also reported sightings near the Peru-Ecuador border, but these are most likely based on captives. It is known only from five different localities. The IUCN classifies it as least concern given its wide distribution and presumably large population. A possible threat to its survival is deforestation.
