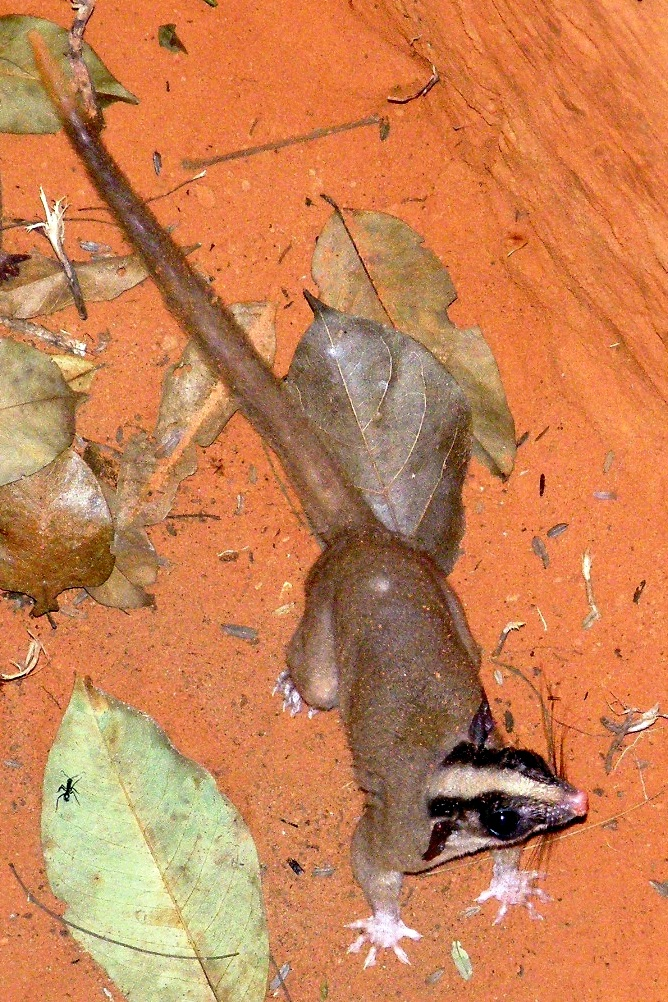

Conservation status
- Least Concern (IUCN 3.1)

Scientific classification
- Kingdom: Animalia
- Phylum: Chordata
- Class: Mammalia
- Infraclass: Marsupialia
- Order: Didelphimorphia
- Family: Didelphidae
- Subfamily: Glironiinae; Voss & Jansa, 2009
- Genus: Glironia; Thomas, 1912
- Species: G. venusta

Binomial name
- Glironia venusta Thomas, 1912
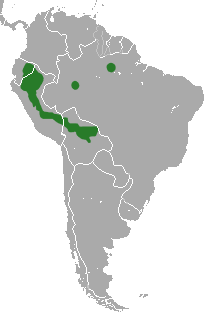
- Range of the bushy-tailed opossum

Synonyms
- G. aequetorialis H. E. Anthony, 1926; G. criniger H. E. Anthony, 1926

= Bushy-tailed opossum =

Species of marsupial

The bushy-tailed opossum (Glironia venusta) is an opossum from South America. It was first described by English zoologist Oldfield Thomas in 1912. It is a medium-sized opossum characterized by a large, oval, dark ears, fawn to cinnamon coat with a buff to gray underside, grayish limbs, and a furry tail. Little is known of the behavior of the bushy-tailed opossum; less than 25 specimens are known. It appears to be arboreal (tree-living), nocturnal (active mainly at night) and solitary. The diet probably comprises insects, eggs and plant material. This opossum has been captured from heavy, humid, tropical forests; it has been reported from Bolivia, Brazil, Colombia, Ecuador and Peru. The IUCN classifies it as least concern.

== Taxonomy and etymology ==
The bushy-tailed opossum is the sole member of Glironia, and is placed in the family Didelphidae. It was first described by English zoologist Oldfield Thomas in 1912. Earlier, Glironia was considered part of the subfamily Didelphinae. A 1955 revision of marsupial phylogeny grouped Caluromys, Caluromysiops, Dromiciops (monito del monte) and Glironia under a single subfamily, Microbiotheriinae, noting the dental similarities among these. A 1977 study argued that these similarities are the result of convergent evolution, and placed Caluromys, Caluromysiops and Glironia in a new subfamily, Caluromyinae. In another similar revision, the bushy-tailed opossum was placed in its own subfamily, Glironiinae.

The cladogram below, based on a 2016 study, shows the phylogenetic relationships of the bushy-tailed opossum.

- - - Bushy-tailed opossum (Glironia venusta)
    - Caluromyinae
      - Black-shouldered opossum (Caluromyopsis irrupta)
      - - Derby's woolly opossum (Caluromys derbianus)
        - - Bare-tailed woolly opossum (Caluromys philander)
          - Brown-eared woolly opossum (Caluromys lanatus)
  - - Kalinowski's mouse opossum (Hyladelphys kalinowskii)
    - - Marmosini
      - - Didelphini
        - Thylamyini

The generic name is a compound of the Latin glir ("dormouse") and Greek suffix -ia (pertains to "quality" or "condition"). The specific name, venusta, means "charming" in Latin.

== Description ==
The bushy-tailed opossum is a medium-sized opossum characterized by a large, oval, dark ears, fawn to cinnamon coat with a buff to gray underside, grayish limbs, and, as its name suggests, a furry tail. The face is marked by two bold, dark stripes extending from either side of the nose through the eyes to the back of the ears. These stripes are separated by a thinner grayish white band, that runs from the midline of the nose to the nape of the neck. The texture of hairs ranges from soft to woolly; the hairs on the back measure 7 to 8 millimetres (0.28 to 0.31 in). Five nipples can be seen on the abdomen; it lacks a marsupium. The tail, 19.5 to 22.5 centimetres (7.7 to 8.9 in) long, becomes darker and less bushy towards the tip. Basically the same in color as the coat, the tip may be completely white or have diffuse white hairs.

The head-and-body length is typically between 16 and 20.5 centimetres (6.3 and 8.1 in), the hindfeet measure 2.7 to 3.1 centimetres (1.1 to 1.2 in) and the ears are 2.2 to 2.5 centimetres (0.87 to 0.98 in) long. It weighs nearly 140 grams (4.9 oz). The dental formula is 5.1.3.44.1.3.4 – typical of all didelphids. Canines and molars are poorly developed. Differences from Marmosa species (mouse opossums) include smaller ears, longer and narrower rostrum, and greater erectness in canines. The monito del monte has a similar bushy tail. A study of the male reproductive system noted that the bushy-tailed opossum has two pairs of bulbourethral glands, as in Caluromys and Gracilinanus, but unlike other didelphids that have three pairs. The urethral grooves of the glans penis end near the tips.

== Ecology and behavior ==
Little is known of the behavior of the bushy-tailed opossum. Less than 25 specimens are known. A study noted the morphological features of the opossum that could allow for powerful movements during locomotion, and deduced that it is arboreal (tree-living). It appears to be solitary and nocturnal (active mainly at night). An individual was observed running through and leaping over vines, in a manner typical of opossums, probably hunting for insects. Its diet may be similar to that of the mouse opossums – insects, eggs and plant material.

== Distribution and status ==
The bushy-tailed opossum has been captured from heavy, humid, tropical forests, and has not been recorded outside forests. It occurs up to an altitude of 5 kilometres (16,000 ft) above sea level. The range has not been precisely determined; specimens have been collected from regions of Bolivia, Brazil, Colombia, Ecuador and Peru. The IUCN classifies the bushy-tailed opossum as least concern, given its wide distribution and presumably large population. The major threats to its survival are deforestation and human settlement.
