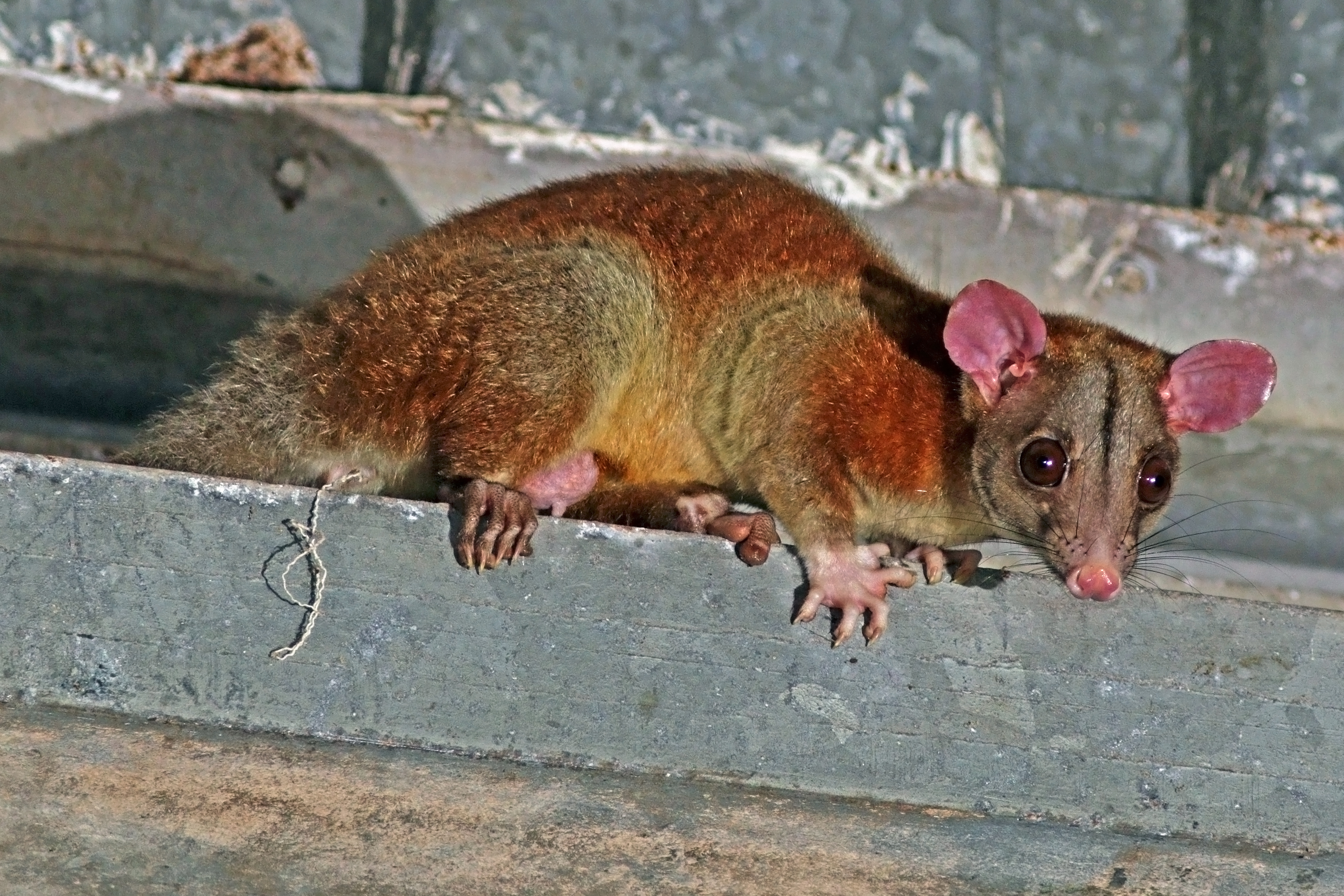

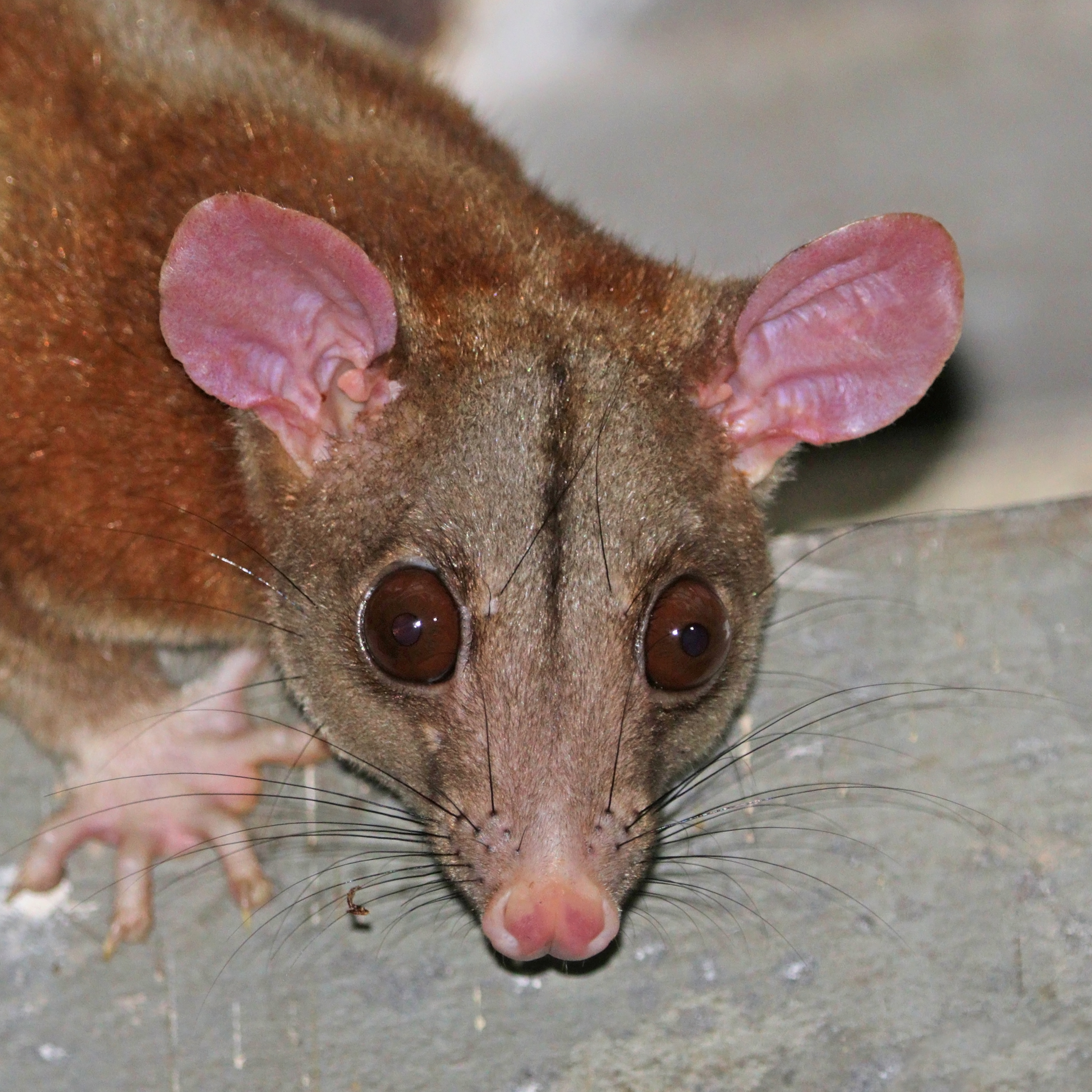
- Inside Canopy Tower, Panama

Conservation status
- Least Concern (IUCN 3.1)

Scientific classification
- Kingdom: Animalia
- Phylum: Chordata
- Class: Mammalia
- Infraclass: Marsupialia
- Order: Didelphimorphia
- Family: Didelphidae
- Genus: Caluromys
- Subgenus: Mallodelphys
- Species: C. derbianus

Binomial name
- Caluromys derbianus (Waterhouse, 1841)
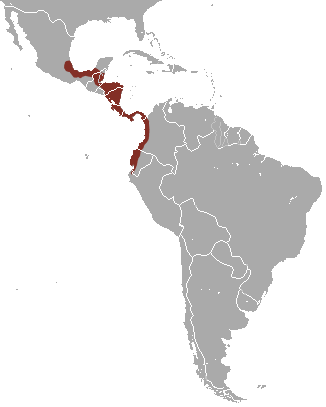
- Range of Derby's woolly opossum

Synonyms
- List: Didelphys derbiana Waterhouse, 1841 Philander laniger derbianus (Waterhouse, 1841) Didelphys (Philander) lanigera O. Thomas, 1888 Philander laniger pallidus O. Thomas, 1899 Didelphis (Micoureus) pallidus (O. Thomas, 1899) Philander laniger guayanus O. Thomas, 1899 Caluromys laniger guayanus (O. Thomas, 1899) Didelphis (Micoureus) guayanus (O. Thomas, 1899) Caluromys laniger pyrrhus O. Thomas, 1901 Didelphis (Micoureus) aztecus (O. Thomas, 1913) Philander laniger aztecus O. Thomas, 1913 Philander laniger fervidus O. Thomas, 1913 Didelphis (Micoureus) fervidus (O. Thomas, 1913) Philander laniger nauticus O. Thomas, 1913 Didelphis (Micoureus) nauticus (O. Thomas, 1913) Philander laniger pictus O. Thomas, 1913 Philander laniger senex O. Thomas, 1913 Didelphis (Micoureus) pictus (O. Thomas, 1913) Didelphis (Micoureus) senex (O. Thomas, 1913) Philander centralis Hollister, 1914 Didelphis (Micoureus) centralis (Hollister, 1914) Didelphis (Micoureus) pulcher Matschie, 1917 Didelphis (Micoureus) canus Matschie, 1917 Micoureus canus (Matschie, 1917) Didelphis (Micoureus) antioquiae Matschie, 1917

= Derby's woolly opossum =

Species of marsupial

Derby's woolly opossum (Caluromys derbianus), or the Central American woolly opossum, is an opossum found in deciduous and moist evergreen forests of Central America, from southern Mexico to western Ecuador and Colombia. It was first described by English naturalist George Robert Waterhouse, and named in honor of Edward Smith-Stanley, 13th Earl of Derby. Derby's woolly opossum is the largest in its genus, with a total length of 60 to 70 centimetres (24 to 28 in) and weight between 200 and 400 grams (7.1 and 14.1 oz). The coat is brown and the underside white-buff to golden-brown. The opossum is nocturnal (active mainly at night), arboreal (tree-living) and solitary. Diet consists of fruits, nectar, small invertebrates and vertebrates. The time when breeding takes place varies geographically. The litter size ranges from one to six. The IUCN classifies this opossum as least concern.

== Taxonomy and etymology ==
Derby's woolly opossum is one of the three members of Caluromys, and is placed in the family Didelphidae. It was first described by English naturalist George Robert Waterhouse as Didelphis derbianus in 1841. He was named in honor of Edward Smith-Stanley, 13th Earl of Derby, to whose museum the specimen used for the description belonged. It was given its present binomial name, Caluromys derbianus, by American zoologist Joel Asaph Allen in 1900. A 1955 revision of marsupial phylogeny grouped Caluromys, Caluromysiops, Dromiciops (monito del monte) and Glironia (bushy-tailed opossum) under a single subfamily, Microbiotheriinae, noting the dental similarities among these. A 1977 study argued that these similarities are the result of convergent evolution, and placed Caluromys, Caluromysiops and Glironia in a new subfamily, Caluromyinae. In another similar revision, the bushy-tailed opossum was placed in its own subfamily, Glironiinae.

The following seven subspecies are recognized:

- C. d. aztecus (Thomas, 1913): Occurs in Mexico.
- C. d. canus (Matschie, 1917): Occurs in Nicaragua.
- C. d. centralis (Hollister, 1914): Occurs in Costa Rica.
- C. d. derbianus (Waterhouse, 1841): Occurs in Colombia, Ecuador and Panama.
- C. d. fervidus (Thomas, 1913): Occurs in the lowlands of north-central Guatemala and northern Honduras.
- C. d. nauticus (Thomas, 1913): Occurs in Gobernadora Island, off the coast of Panama.
- C. d. pallidus (Thomas, 1899): Occurs in Panama.

The cladogram below, based on a 2016 study, shows the phylogenetic relationships of Derby's woolly opossum.

- - - Bushy-tailed opossum (Glironia venusta)
    - Caluromyinae
      - Black-shouldered opossum (Caluromyopsis irrupta)
      - - Derby's woolly opossum (Caluromys derbianus)
        - - Bare-tailed woolly opossum (Caluromys philander)
          - Brown-eared woolly opossum (Caluromys lanatus)
  - - Kalinowski's mouse opossum (Hyladelphys kalinowskii)
    - - Marmosini
      - - Didelphini
        - Thylamyini

== Description ==
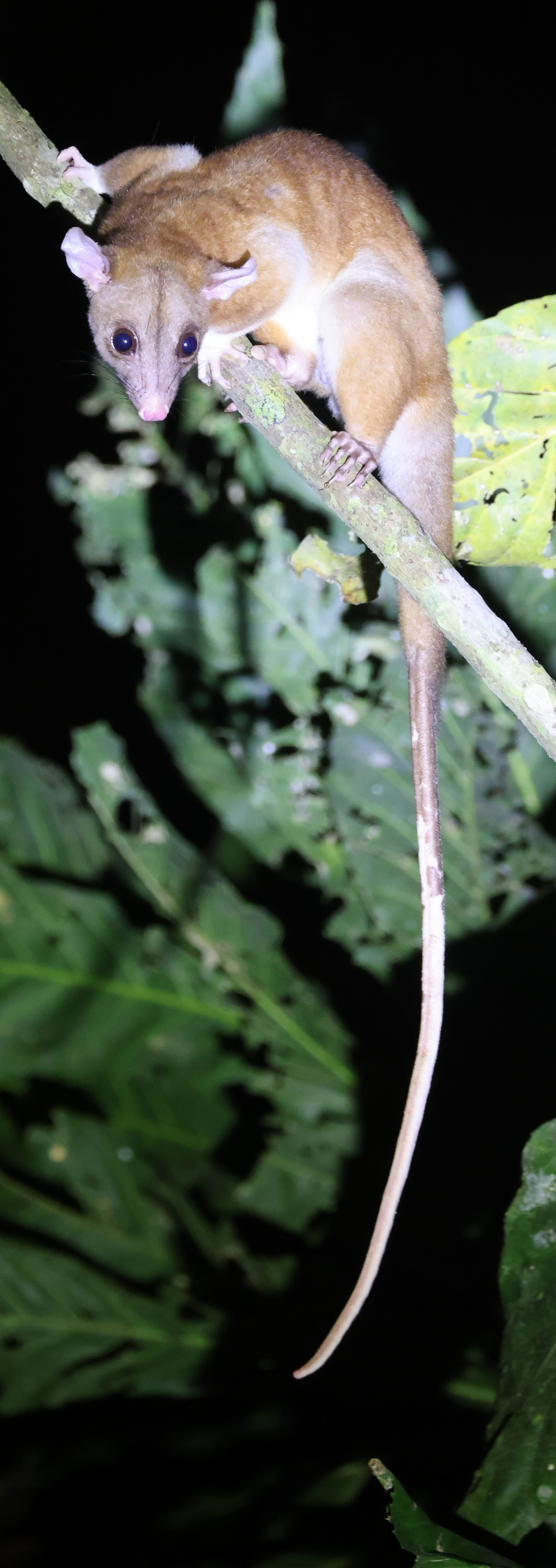
Derby's wooly opossum

3D scan of the skull of a Derby's wooly opossum

Derby's woolly opossum is the largest in its genus, with a total length of 60 to 70 centimetres (24 to 28 in) and weight between 200 and 400 grams (7.1 and 14.1 oz). It is characterized by white to pink ears, lightly colored limbs, a brown coat (lighter than that of the brown-eared woolly opossum), white-buff to golden-brown underside, and the prehensile tail (tail that can be used to grab objects) that accounts for 58 to 67 percent of the total length. A dark streak runs from along the midline of the nose up to the crown. Coat color varies geographically. The tail is partially naked, as in the bare-tailed woolly opossum. Like others in Caluromys, it has a pouch. The ears measure about 4 centimetres (1.6 in) and the hindfeet 3.5 centimetres (1.4 in). Claws are present in all the five digits of the forefeet and two of either hindfoot. The dental formula is 5.1.3.44.1.3.4. The eyes glow red on exposure to light.

== Ecology and behavior ==
Derby's woolly opossum is nocturnal (active mainly at night), solitary, and spends most of the day in nests made of dead leaves in cavities in the upper reaches of trees. Studies show that activity levels may increase if food is scarce, and decrease on exposure to light. The animal is an efficient climber, and the tail assists in grasping branches. It shows remarkable agility in moving among vines and branches. When disturbed, it might attack defensively by biting; it can produce squeals when distressed. Predators include ocelots.

=== Diet ===
Diet comprises fruits of pepper vines and Cecropia species, nectar of the balsa tree, Mabea occidentalis and Trichanthera gigantea, small invertebrates and vertebrates. After feeding, the opossum will lick the forepaws and use them to clean its face; they can also be used to clean the flanks, underbelly and the portion of the tail nearer to the tip.

=== Reproduction ===
Both sexes become sexually mature by seven to nine months. The estrus cycle is nearly 28 days long. The time when breeding takes place varies geographically – it takes place during the dry season in Panama (late January or early February) and probably throughout the year in Nicaragua. Males have been observed pursuing the female before copulation occurs. The litter size ranges from one to six. The lifespan is not known for sure; one individual in New York Zoological Park lived for five years and three months.

== Distribution and status ==
Derby's woolly opossum inhabits deciduous and moist evergreen forests up to an altitude of 2,600 metres (8,500 ft). The range extends from Veracruz in southern Mexico southward into South America to western Ecuador and Cauca River valley in Colombia. The IUCN classifies it as least concern, given its presumably large numbers. Earlier, it used to be targeted for its fur. Populations in Ecuador and Mexico, however, are threatened by deforestation.
