= Soroche =

Soroche (sometimes spelled sorojchi) can refer to:

- Altitude sickness
- the Cerro Soroche, a mountain in Ecuador
- Soroche pills, an Andean mountain sickness medication
- Soroche (plant), a species of South American flowering plant
