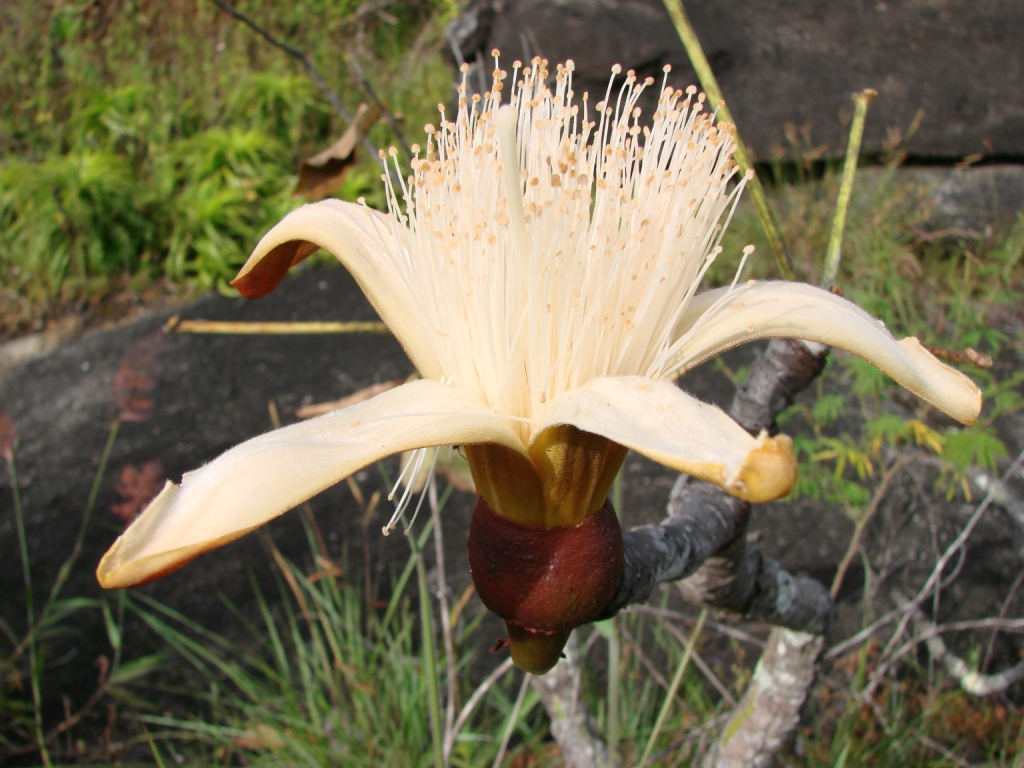

Scientific classification
- Kingdom: Plantae
- Clade: Tracheophytes
- Clade: Angiosperms
- Clade: Eudicots
- Clade: Rosids
- Order: Malvales
- Family: Malvaceae
- Genus: Pseudobombax
- Species: P. tomentosum

Binomial name
- Pseudobombax tomentosum (Mart. & Zucc.) A.Robyns

Synonyms
- Bombax martianum K. Schum; Bombax martianum subsp. guaraniticum Hassl.; Carolinea tomentosa Mart. & Zucc.; Pachira tomentosa (Mart. & Zucc.) Endl. ex Walp.

= Pseudobombax tomentosum =

Species of tree

Pseudobombax tomentosum is a species of deciduous tree native to South America.

== Description ==
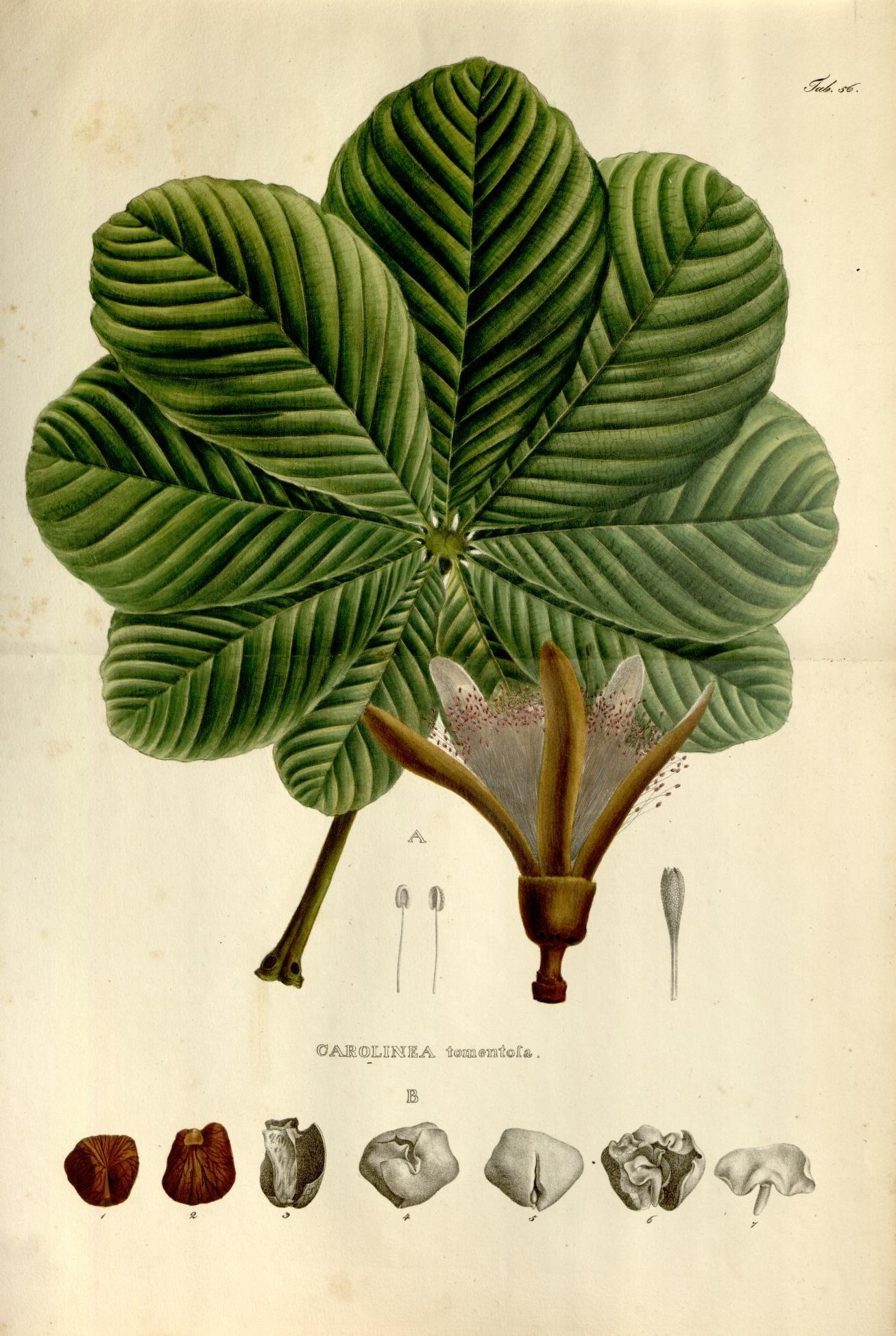
Illustration showing details of plant now know as Pseudobombax tomentosum.

Pseudobombax tomentosum is found along the edges of forests in a clumped pattern. It branches horizontally and usually the ends of these branches are in contact with the canopy of the forest. Flowering occurs after leaves fall, in the dry season. The flowers are located at the end of the branches, erect or slightly inclined. The flowers range from 16–20 cm (6.3–7.9 in) in diameter, and are predominantly white. The receptacle, perianth, and stamens form a chamber where nectar gathers. The pistil of the flower is erect and the stigma is localized 4 cm (1.6 in) above the anthers. The stamens and pistils are strong yet flexible. Flowers are only functional for a single night.

== Habitat and ecology ==
Pseudobombax tomentosum is present on the outskirts of forests or roads in Brazil and Paraguay in South America.

The large and rigid structure of the tree's flowers, combined with the flower's placement on the ends of branches and the chamber for nectar favors pollination by medium-sized mammals such as Caluromys as well as various bats. The plant is predominantly pollinated by bats, but the species Caluromys lanatus frequents the tree in its native habitat as the placement and infrequency of flowers favors the movement of marsupials from one tree to another.

== Human use ==
As the wood of the tree is not very durable, it is used in low value goods such as toys, boxes, or wooden shoes. The fibers of the bark are used to make thread for filling cushions or to make light felt. The tree is occasionally used for landscaping or as an ornamental.
