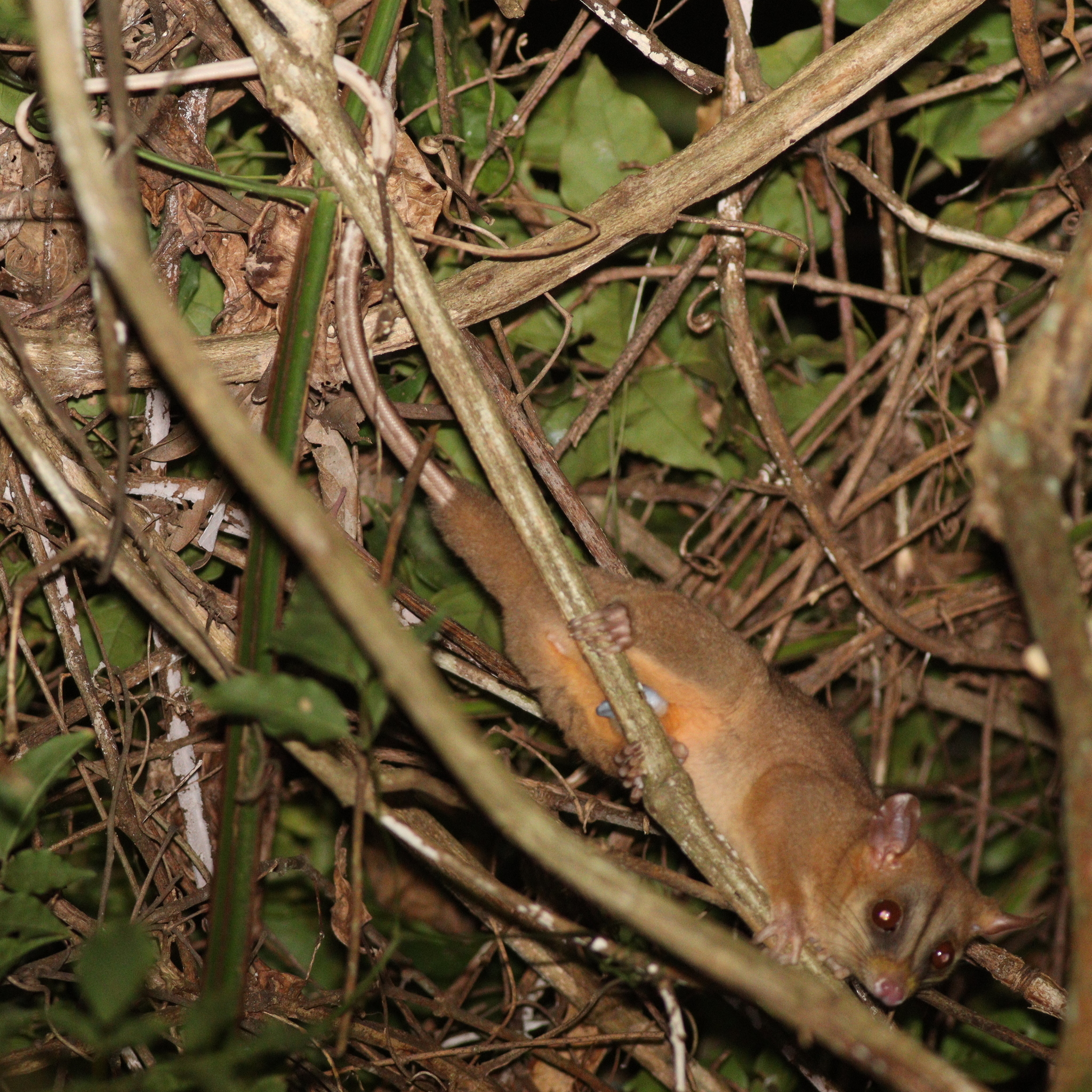

Conservation status
- Least Concern (IUCN 3.1)

Scientific classification
- Kingdom: Animalia
- Phylum: Chordata
- Class: Mammalia
- Infraclass: Marsupialia
- Order: Didelphimorphia
- Family: Didelphidae
- Genus: Caluromys
- Species: C. philander

Binomial name
- Caluromys philander (Linnaeus, 1758)

Subspecies
- C. p. affinis (Wagner, 1842); C. p. dichurus (Wagner, 1842); C. p. philander (Linnaeus, 1758); C. p. trinitatis (O. Thomas, 1894)
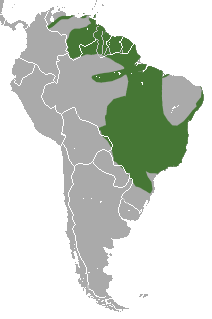
- Range of the bare-tailed woolly opossum

Synonyms
- List: Didelphis philander Linnaeus, 1758; Micoureus philander (Linnaeus, 1758); Gamba philander (Linnaeus, 1758); Didelphys (Philander) philander (Linnaeus, 1758); Caluromys philander (Linnaeus, 1758); Philander philander philander (Linnaeus, 1758); Didelphis cajopolin P. L. S. Müller, 1776; Didelphys cayopollin von Schreber, 1777; Sarigua cayopollin (von Schreber, 1777); Didelphys (Philander) cayopollin (von Schreber, 1777); Didelphis cayopollin Kerr, 1792; Didelphis flavescens Brongniart, 1792; Didelphis dorsigera Desmoulins, 1824; Didelphys affinis Wagner, 1842; Caluromys affinis (Wagner, 1842); Philander philander affinis (Wagner, 1842); Didelphys dichura Wagner, 1842; Didelphys dichrura Schinz, 1844; Caluromys philander dichrurus (Schinz, 1844); Philander philander dichrura (Schinz, 1844); Didelphys macrura Pelzeln, 1883; Didelphys longicaudata Pelzeln, 1883; Didelphys (Philander) trinitatis O. Thomas, 1894; Philander trinitatis (O. Thomas, 1894); Caluromys trinitatis (O. Thomas, 1894); Philander trinitatis trinitatis (O. Thomas, 1894); Caluromys trinitatis venezuelae O. Thomas, 1903; Philander trinitatis venezuelae (O. Thomas, 1903); Caluromys trinitatis leucurus O. Thomas, 1904; Philander trinitatis leucurus (O. Thomas, 1904)

= Bare-tailed woolly opossum =

Species of marsupial

The bare-tailed woolly opossum (Caluromys philander) is an opossum from South America. It was first described by Swedish zoologist Carl Linnaeus in 1758. The bare-tailed woolly opossum is characterized by a gray head, brown to gray coat, orange to gray underside and a partially naked tail. It is nocturnal (active mainly at night) and solitary; there is hardly any social interaction except between mother and juveniles and in mating pairs. The opossum constructs nests in tree cavities, and its litter size ranges from one to seven. Gestation lasts 25 days, and the juveniles exit the pouch after three months; weaning occurs a month later. The bare-tailed woolly opossum inhabits subtropical forests, rainforests, secondary forests, and plantations; its range extends from northern Venezuela to northeastern and southcentral Brazil. The IUCN classifies this opossum as least concern.

== Names ==
It is called mucura-xixica in Portuguese, zarigüeya lanuda parda in Spanish, and wakaro in the Kwaza language of Rondônia, Brazil.

== Taxonomy ==
The bare-tailed woolly opossum is one of the three members of Caluromys, and is placed in the family Didelphidae in the marsupial order Didelphimorphia. It was first described by Swedish zoologist Carl Linnaeus as Didelphis philander in the 10th edition of Systema Naturae (1758). It was given its present binomial name, Caluromys philander, by American zoologist Joel Asaph Allen in 1900. A 1955 revision of marsupial phylogeny grouped Caluromys, Caluromysiops, Dromiciops (monito del monte) and Glironia (bushy-tailed opossum) under a single subfamily, Microbiotheriinae, noting the dental similarities among these. A 1977 study argued that these similarities are the result of convergent evolution, and placed Caluromys, Caluromysiops and Glironia in a new subfamily, Caluromyinae. In another similar revision in 2009, the bushy-tailed opossum was placed in its own subfamily, Glironiinae.

The following four subspecies are recognized:

- C. p. affinis (Wagner, 1842): Occurs in Mato Grosso (Brazil) and Bolivia.
- C. p. dichurus (Wagner, 1842): Occurs in eastern and southeastern Brazil.
- C. p. philander (Linnaeus, 1758): Occurs to the east of Rio Negro in Brazil, the Guianas, and to the south of the Orinoco River in Venezuela.
- C. p. trinitatis (Thomas, 1894): Occurs in Trinidad and to the north of the Orinoco River in Venezuela.

The cladogram below, based on a 2016 study, shows the phylogenetic relationships of the bare-tailed woolly opossum.

- - - Bushy-tailed opossum (Glironia venusta)
    - Caluromyinae
      - Black-shouldered opossum (Caluromyopsis irrupta)
      - - Derby's woolly opossum (Caluromys derbianus)
        - - Bare-tailed woolly opossum (Caluromys philander)
          - Brown-eared woolly opossum (Caluromys lanatus)
  - - Kalinowski's mouse opossum (Hyladelphys kalinowskii)
    - - Marmosini
      - - Didelphini
        - Thylamyini

== Description ==
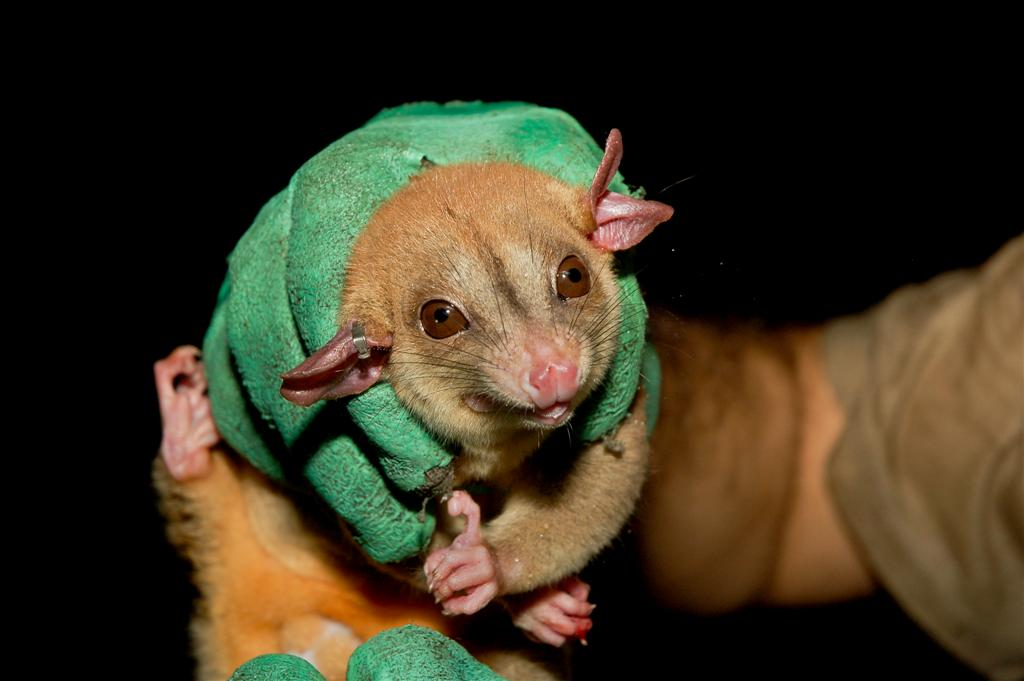
Close view of a bare-tailed woolly opossum

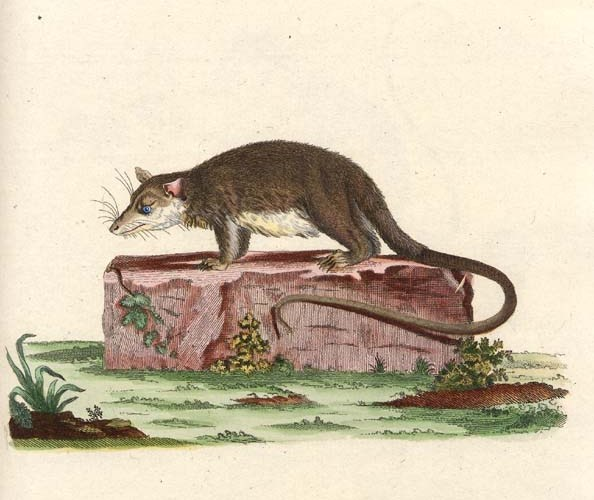
A 1780 illustration by Johann Christian Daniel von Schreber

The bare-tailed woolly opossum is characterized by a brown to gray coat, gray head, orange to gray underside and a partially naked tail furry at the base. A distinctive, narrow dark brown stripe runs between the eyes and the ears, from the tip of the nose to the back of the ears. Similar but broad streaks run from brown rings around either eye. Grayish fur separates these stripes from one another. Ears are large and almost always hairless. The coat is thick, soft and woolly; the flanks may be grayer than the back. The dorsal hairs continue up to 5–7 centimetres (2.0–2.8 in) onto the tail, after which it is naked, as the name suggests. The tail is dark brown towards the end, spotted with white and dark brown, terminating in a white or yellowish-white tip.

The size appears to decrease from Venezuela to Suriname; the mean weight is 170 grams (6.0 oz) in Venezuela and 250 grams (8.8 oz) in Suriname. The head-and-body length is typically between 16 and 26 centimetres (6.3 and 10.2 in). The ears measure 3 to 3.5 centimetres (1.2 to 1.4 in), the tail 25 to 36 centimetres (9.8 to 14.2 in) and the hind feet 3.2 to 3.9 centimetres (1.3 to 1.5 in). The dental formula is 5.1.3.44.1.3.4 – typical of didelphids.

== Ecology and behavior ==
The bare-tailed woolly opossum is nocturnal (active mainly at night), and thus difficult to observe or capture. Nevertheless, it is one of the very few opossums that have been successfully studied in detail. A study showed that activity of bare-tailed woolly opossums can be affected by the extent of moonlight. While activity in males dropped from new moon to full moon (that is, with increasing exposure to moonlight), activity in females remained largely unaffected. The opossum is arboreal (tree-living) and a good climber. A study showed that the tail, being prehensile, can act as an additional limb for locomotion, avoiding falls and carrying leaves to build nests. It builds nests with dry leaves in tree cavities.

Individuals tend to be aggressive to one another; hisses, grunts and even distress calls accompany agonistic behavior. Largely solitary, the only interactions observed are between mother and juveniles and in a mating pair. In a primary forest of French Guiana, the mean home range size was calculated as 3 hectares (0.012 sq mi). Ranges of both sexes overlapped extensively. The size of home ranges is influenced by environmental factors such as forage availability and individual needs. 'Click's are a common vocalization, produced by the young as well as adults. Bare-tailed woolly opossums, like other Caluromys species, will bite on being handled or to escape predators. Predators include the jaguarundi and margay. The Bare-tailed woolly opossum is a host of the Acanthocephalan intestinal parasite Gigantorhynchus lutzi.

=== Diet ===
An omnivore, the bare-tailed woolly opossum feeds on fruits, vegetables, gum, flowers, nectar, arthropods (such as beetles, butterflies and other insects), other small invertebrates, small birds and reptiles. A study of the foraging behavior of the bare-tailed woolly opossum and the sympatric kinkajou showed that both feed on a variety of plants, choose plants by their abundance, show similar preferences, and favor certain plant parts at certain times of the year. A notable difference between the two was that while the kinkajou focused on plants with a wide distribution, the bare-tailed woolly opossum also fed on less common plants.

=== Reproduction ===
In French Guiana, females mate successfully after they are a year old. Females can have three litters a year, unless food is scarce. Gestation lasts 25 days – the longest among didelphimorphs; the young come out of the pouch at three months and weaning occurs at four months. A study in French Guiana showed that development of the offspring is slow for the first 40 days, and then accelerates during the last 40 days. The litter size ranges from one to seven. Newborn weigh 200 milligrams (0.0071 oz), and their weight increases to 11 grams (0.39 oz) after weaning. After exiting the pouch, offspring are sheltered in nests, where the mother regularly visits them for nursing.

== Distribution and status ==
The bare-tailed woolly opossum inhabits subtropical forests, rainforests, secondary forests and plantations; it prefers dense cover, though it can be seen on canopies as well. It can occur up to an altitude of 1,200–1,800 metres (3,900–5,900 ft) above the sea level. The range extends from northern Venezuela eastward to northeastern and southcentral Brazil, and includes Guiana, French Guiana, Margarita Island, Trinidad, and Suriname. The IUCN classifies the bare-tailed woolly opossum as least concern, due to its wide distribution and presumed large population. The survival of this opossum is threatened by deforestation and habitat loss.
