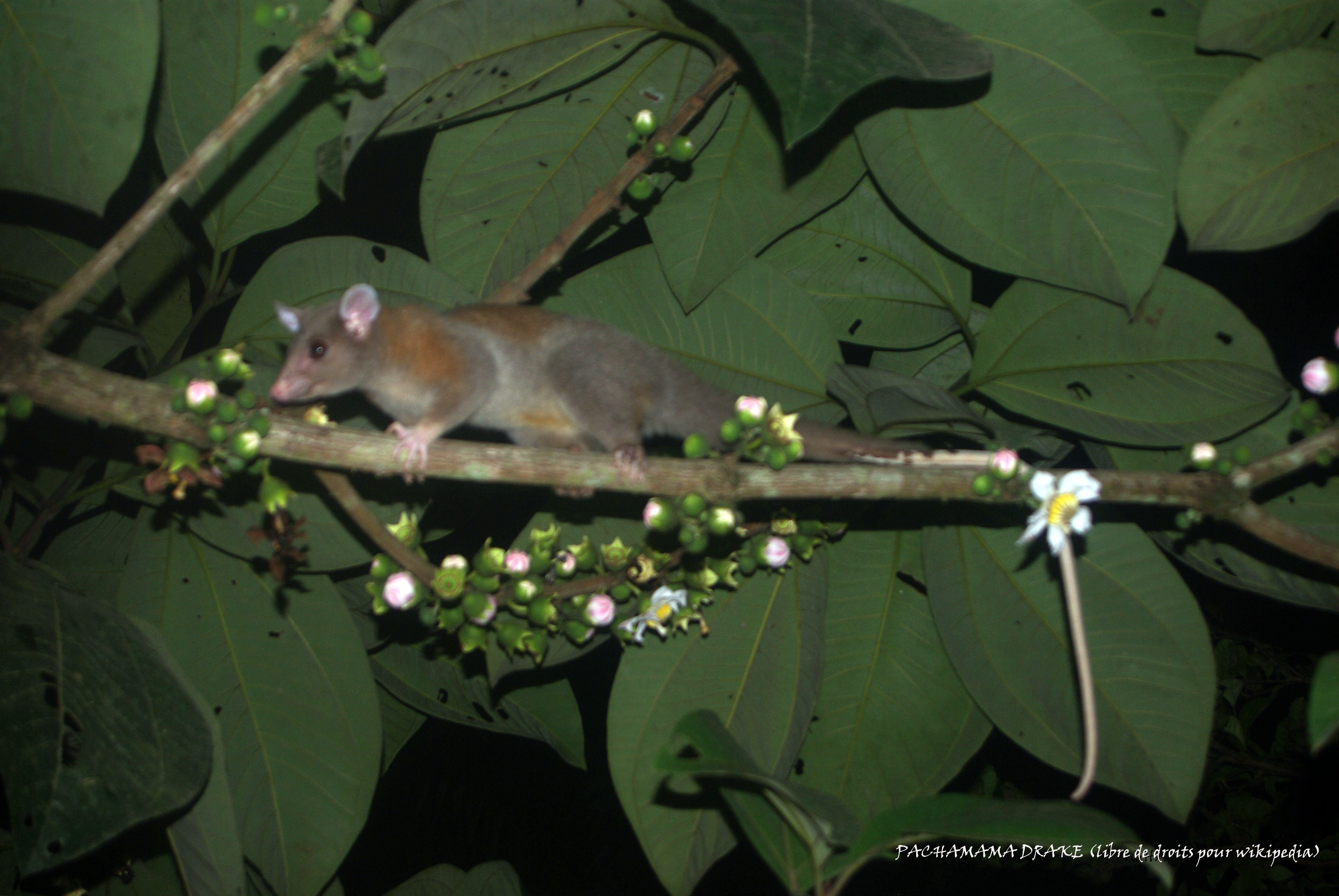

Conservation status
- Least Concern (IUCN 3.1)

Scientific classification
- Kingdom: Animalia
- Phylum: Chordata
- Class: Mammalia
- Infraclass: Marsupialia
- Order: Didelphimorphia
- Family: Didelphidae
- Genus: Caluromys
- Subgenus: Mallodelphys
- Species: C. lanatus

Binomial name
- Caluromys lanatus (Olfers, 1818)

Subspecies
- C. l. cicur (Bangs, 1898); C. l. lanatus (Olfers, 1818); C. l. ochropus (Wagner, 1842); C. l. ornatus (Tschudi, 1845)
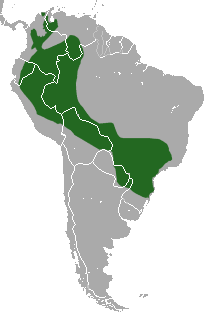
- Brown-eared woolly opossum range

Synonyms
- List: Didelphys lanata Illiger, 1815 nomen nudum; Didelphys lanata Olfers, 1818; Philander lanata (Olfers, 1818); Didelphis lanigera Desmarest, 1820; Didelphys lanigera (Desmarest, 1820); Micoureus lanigera (Desmarest, 1820); Didelphys (Philander) lanigera (Desmarest, 1820); Caluromys laniger (Desmarest, 1820); Philander laniger (Desmarest, 1820); Didelphys ochropus Wagner, 1842; Didelphys (Philander) laniger ochropus Wagner, 1842; Caluromys ochropus (Wagner, 1842); Didelphis (Micoureus) ochropus (Wagner, 1842); Philander laniger ochropus (Wagner, 1842); Mallodelphis lanigera ochropus (Wagner, 1842); Caluromys laniger ochropus (Wagner, 1842); Didelphys ornata Tschudi, 1845; Philander ornatus (Tschudi, 1845); Didelphys (Philander) laniger ornata Tschudi, 1845; Caluromys derbianus ornatus (Tschudi, 1845); Caluromys ornatus (Tschudi, 1845); Didelphys (Philander) laniger ornatus (Tschudi, 1845); Philander laniger ornatus (Tschudi, 1845); Didelphis (Micoureus) ornatus (Tschudi, 1845); Caluromys laniger ornatus (Tschudi, 1845); Philander cicur Bangs, 1898; Didelphys (Philander) cicur (Bangs, 1898); Caluromys cicur (Bangs, 1898); Caluromys laniger cicur (Bangs, 1898); Philander laniger cicur Bangs, 1898; Philander laniger jivaro O. Thomas, 1913; Caluromys laniger jivaro (O. Thomas, 1913); Didelphis (Micoureus) meridensis Matschie, 1917; Didelphis (Micoureus) cahyensis Matschie, 1917; Didelphis (Micoureus) nattereri Matschie, 1917; Mallodelphis lanigera nattereri (Matschie, 1917); Didelphis (Micoureus) juninensis Matschie, 1917; Didelphis (Micoureus) bartletti Matschie, 1917; Mallodelphis lanigera hemiura A. Miranda-Ribeiro, 1936; Mallodelphis lanigera modesta A. Miranda-Ribeiro, 1936; Mallodelphis lanigera vitalina A. Miranda-Ribeiro; Philander calmensis C. O. C. Vieira, 1955

= Brown-eared woolly opossum =

Species of marsupial

The brown-eared woolly opossum (Caluromys lanatus), also known as the western woolly opossum, is an opossum from South America. It was first described by German naturalist Ignaz von Olfers in 1818. The opossum is characterized by a brown to reddish brown coat and similarly colored limbs, yellow to orange underbelly, hairless, brown ears with a hint of pink, and a tail furred on the back for up to half of its length. The brown-eared woolly opossum is nocturnal (active mainly at night), solitary and omnivorous. The IUCN lists it as least concern.

== Taxonomy ==
The brown-eared woolly opossum is one of the three members of Caluromys, and is placed in the family Didelphidae. It was first described by German naturalist Ignaz von Olfers as Didelphys lanata in 1818. It was given its present binomial name, Caluromys lanatus, by American zoologist Joel Asaph Allen in 1900.

A 1955 revision of marsupial phylogeny grouped Caluromys, Caluromysiops, Dromiciops (monito del monte) and Glironia (bushy-tailed opossum) under a single subfamily, Microbiotheriinae, noting the dental similarities among these. A 1977 study argued that these similarities are the result of convergent evolution, and placed Caluromys, Caluromysiops and Glironia in a new subfamily, Caluromyinae. In another similar revision, the bushy-tailed opossum was placed in its own subfamily, Glironiinae.

The following four subspecies are recognized:

- C. l. cicur (Bangs, 1898): Occurs in northeastern Colombia and northwestern Venezuela.
- C. l. lanatus (Olfers, 1818): Occurs in Bolivia and Mato Grosso (southwestern Brazil).
- C. l. ochropus (Wagner, 1842): Occurs in western Brazil, extreme southeastern Colombia, eastern Ecuador, Peru and southern Venezuela.
- C. l. ornatus (Tschudi, 1845): Occurs in southern Colombia, the lowlands of Bolivia, Ecuador and Peru, and the valleys of eastern Andes.

Two additional subspecies, C. l. nattereri and C. l. vitalinus, are sometimes recognised, but have been considered to be junior synonyms of C. l. lanatus and C. l. ochropus, respectively.

The cladogram below, based on a 2016 study, shows the phylogenetic relationships of the brown-eared woolly opossum.

- - - Bushy-tailed opossum (Glironia venusta)
    - Caluromyinae
      - Black-shouldered opossum (Caluromyopsis irrupta)
      - - Derby's woolly opossum (Caluromys derbianus)
        - - Bare-tailed woolly opossum (Caluromys philander)
          - Brown-eared woolly opossum (Caluromys lanatus)
  - - Kalinowski's mouse opossum (Hyladelphys kalinowskii)
    - - Marmosini
      - - Didelphini
        - Thylamyini

== Description ==
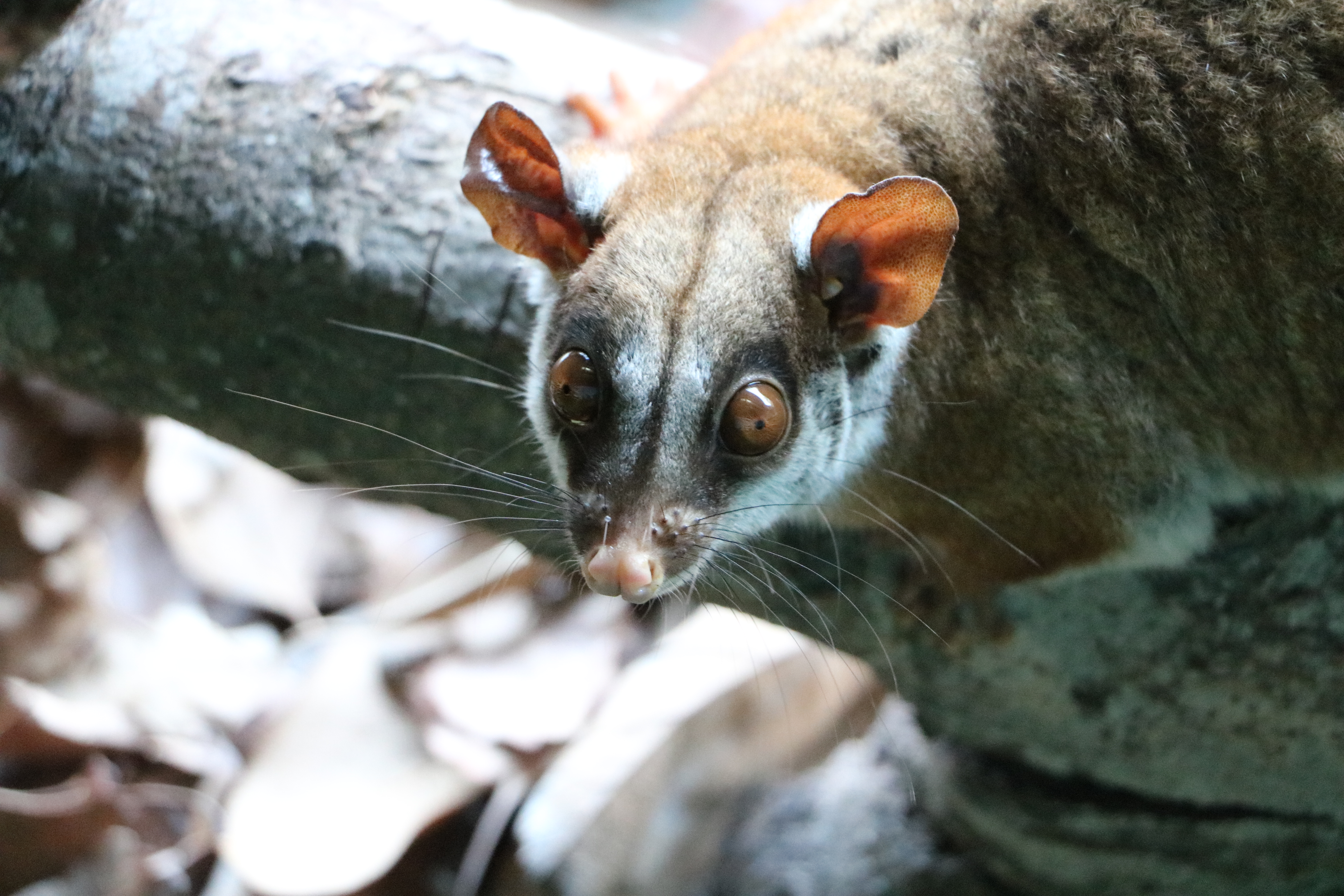
A captive animal, photographed in Peru

The brown-eared woolly opossum is characterized by a brown to reddish brown coat and similarly colored limbs, yellow to orange underbelly, hairless, brown ears with a hint of pink, and a tail furred up to half of its length dorsally (on the back) and up to 20% of its length at the base. The coat may be tinged with gray, and develops a shade of orange on the shoulders, limbs and the crown; young are typically grayer. The fur is fairly long, soft and thick. The tail becomes less bushy towards the tip, leaving the last 30% of the length bare. This naked part is typically white with a yellowish tinge, and spotted with brown. Faint orange rings circle the eyes on the grayish white face. A dark stripe runs up the nose and between the eyes up to the back of the ears. The subspecies may vary in coloration; C. l. circur is largely grayish brown, while C. l. lanatus is a pale brown and does not show spots on the tail.

The head-and-body length is between 20 and 32 centimetres (7.9 and 12.6 in), and the tail is 33 to 45 centimetres (13 to 18 in) long. The opossum weighs 31–52 grams (1.1–1.8 oz). Hindfeet measure 3–5 centimetres (1.2–2.0 in), and the ears measure 3–4 centimetres (1.2–1.6 in). The dental formula is 5.1.3.44.1.3.4 – typical of didelphids. The brown-eared opossum differs from the bare-tailed woolly opossum in having a bushier tail (in the bare-tailed opossum, the tail turns bare abruptly after the first one-third of the length) and a pouch that opens to the front rather than along the midline. Derby's woolly opossum differs from the brown-eared opossum in having white limbs and gray fur between the shoulders. The brown-eared opossum differs from other opossums in having a comparatively large braincase.

== Distribution and status ==
The brown-eared woolly opossum inhabits humid tropical forests (such as primary, secondary and gallery forests), plantations, in mangrove and xerophytic forests, and even in the more densely wooded parts of the cerrado and pantanal. It typically occurs up to 500 metres (1,600 ft) above the sea level, though individuals have been recorded up to 2,600 metres (8,500 ft). The range lies to the east of the Andes – from Bolivia, central Colombia, eastern Ecuador, Peru and western and southern Venezuela to northeastern Argentina, western, central and southern Brazil, eastern and southern Paraguay. The IUCN lists this opossum as least concern given its wide distribution and presumably large numbers, though it is threatened by deforestation in some parts of the range.

== Ecology and behavior ==
The brown-eared woolly opossum is nocturnal (active mainly at night) and solitary, though individuals have been observed foraging in pairs. These opossums are omnivorous and feed on fruits (of plants such as Cecropia, Piper and Solanaceae species), nectar, small invertebrates and vertebrates. A study presented it as a typical frugivore, with a well-developed cecum. By feeding on nectar, the opossum could probably help in the pollination of Pseudobombax tomentosum and Quararibea cordata flowers. They are nocturnal, and generally silent and solitary, although they have occasionally been seen foraging in pairs.

The estrus cycle is 27–29 days long; females will develop a pouch prior to carrying young. The litter size ranges from one to four, while the bare-tailed woolly opossum can have up to seven young.
