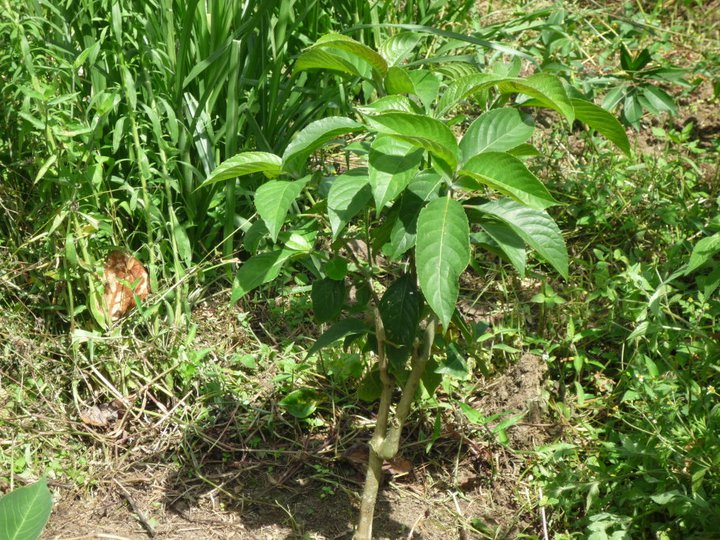
- Trichanthera gigantea

Scientific classification
- Kingdom: Plantae
- Clade: Tracheophytes
- Clade: Angiosperms
- Clade: Eudicots
- Clade: Asterids
- Order: Lamiales
- Family: Acanthaceae
- Subfamily: Acanthoideae
- Tribe: Ruellieae
- Genus: Trichanthera; Kunth (1818)

Species
- See text.

Synonyms
- Trixanthera Raf.

= Trichanthera =

Genus of plants

Trichanthera is a genus of flowering plant in the family Acanthaceae, native to central and southern tropical America. The genus was first described by Carl Sigismund Kunth in 1845.

== Species ==
As of April 2021, Plants of the World Online accepted the following species:

- Trichanthera corymbosa Leonard
- Trichanthera gigantea (Bonpl.) Nees
