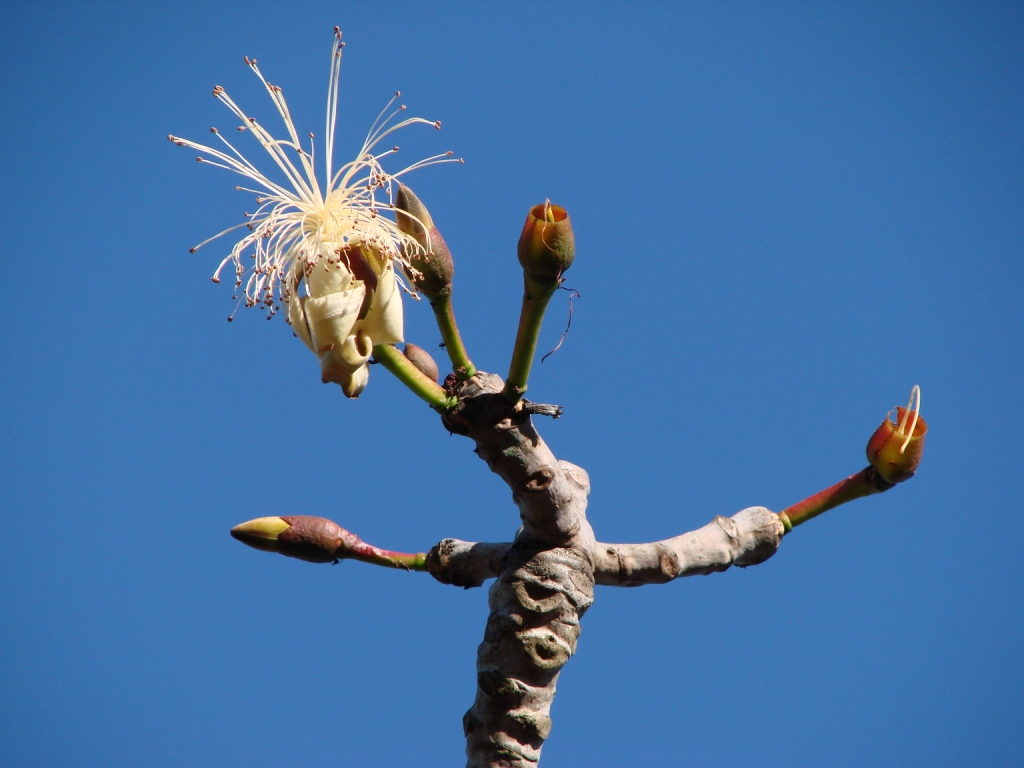
- Pseudobombax longiflorum - Parque Olhos D'Água - Brasília - Distrito Federal - Brasil.
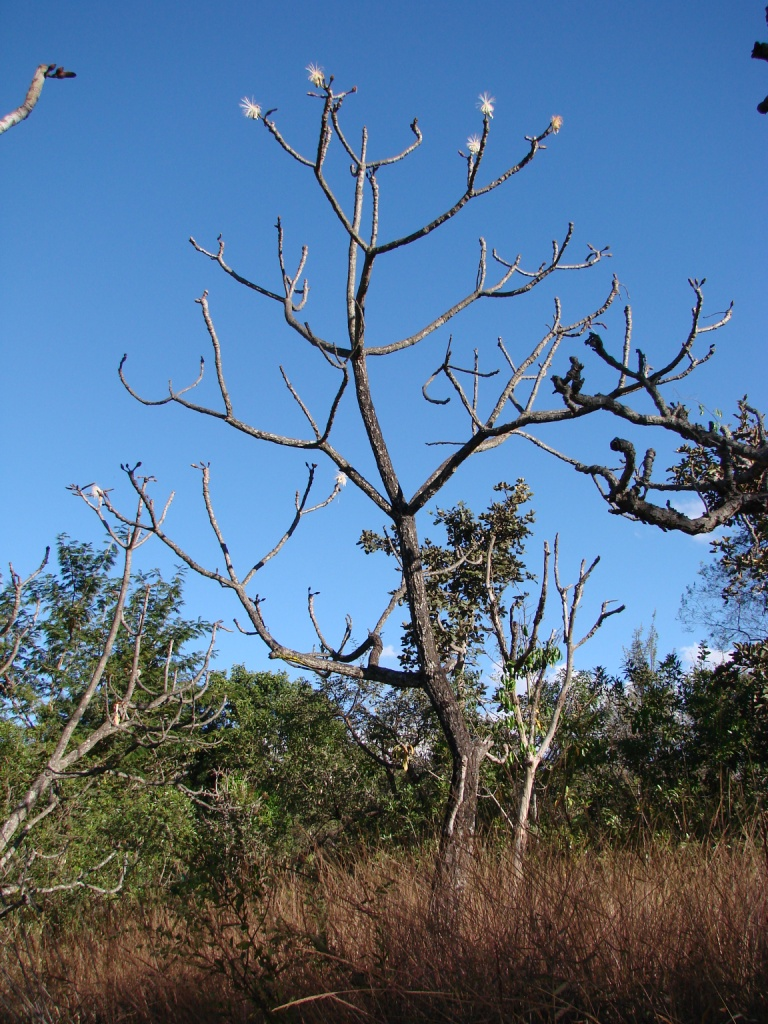

Scientific classification
- Kingdom: Plantae
- Clade: Tracheophytes
- Clade: Angiosperms
- Clade: Eudicots
- Clade: Rosids
- Order: Malvales
- Family: Malvaceae
- Genus: Pseudobombax
- Species: P. longiflorum

Binomial name
- Pseudobombax longiflorum (Mart.) A.Robyns, 1963

Synonyms
- Carolinea longiflora Mart. & Zucc., 1823; Bombax longiflorum (Mart. & Zucc.) K.Schum., 1886; Pachira longiflora (Mart. & Zucc.) Decne., 1881; Bombax cyathophorum var. latifoliatum Hassl., 1913; Bombax cyathophorum var. longipes Hassl., 1913; Bombax elegans R.E.Fr., Kongl., 1908; Bombax longiflorum f. elegans (R.E.Fr.) Hassl., 1910; Bombax longiflorum f. multifoliatum Hassl., 1910; Bombax longiflorum var. emarginatum Hassl., 1910; Bombax rusbyi Baker f., 1907; Pachira macrantha A.St.-Hil., 1825

= Pseudobombax longiflorum =

Species of flowering plant

Pseudobombax longiflorum is a species of flowering plants of the family Malvaceae. It is found in Bolivia and Brazil.
