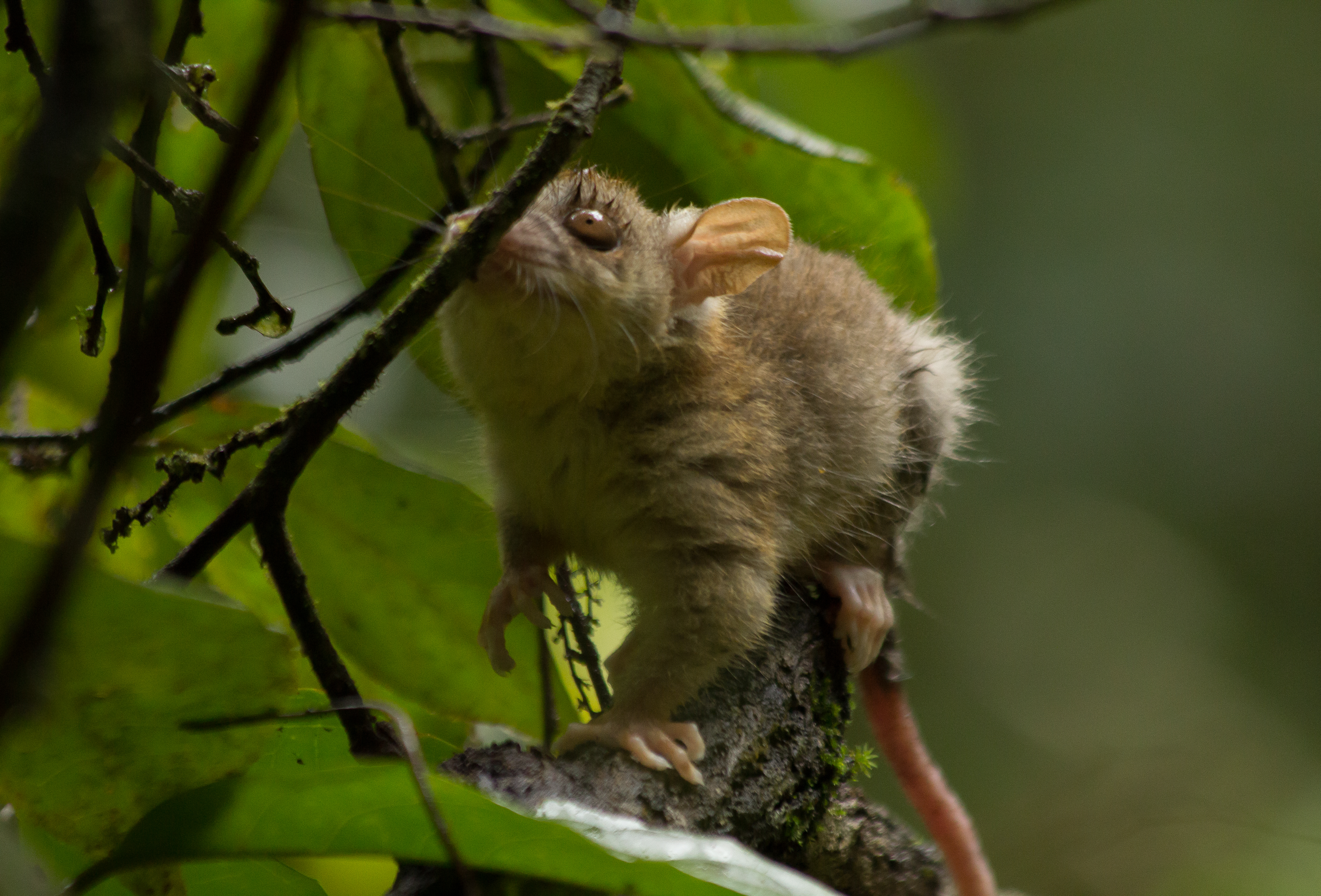
- Bare-tailed Woolly Opossum (Caluromys philander)

Scientific classification
- Kingdom: Animalia
- Phylum: Chordata
- Class: Mammalia
- Infraclass: Marsupialia
- Order: Didelphimorphia
- Family: Didelphidae
- Subfamily: Caluromyinae; Kirsch, 1977

Type genus
- Caluromys J.A. Allen, 1900

Genera
- Caluromys; Caluromysiops; †Pachybiotherium

Synonyms
- Caluromyidae Kirsch & Reig, 1977; Glironiinae Hershkovitz, 1992

= Caluromyinae =

Caluromyinae Temporal range: Burdigalian–Present

Subfamily of marsupials

Caluromyinae is a subfamily of opossums. It includes the extant genera Caluromys and Caluromysiops, as well as the extinct Pachybiotherium. Until recently, the genus Glironia was also included. It has sometimes been classed as a full family, Caluromyidae.

== Classification ==
Classification based on Voss and Jansa (2009)

- Subfamily Caluromyinae
  - Genus Caluromys
    - Subgenus Caluromys
      - Bare-tailed woolly opossum (Caluromys philander)
    - Subgenus Mallodelphys
      - Derby's woolly opossum (Caluromys derbianus)
      - Brown-eared woolly opossum (Caluromys lanatus)
  - Genus Caluromysiops
    - Black-shouldered opossum (Caluromysiops irrupta)
  - Genus †Pachybiotherium
    - †Pachybiotherium acclinum
