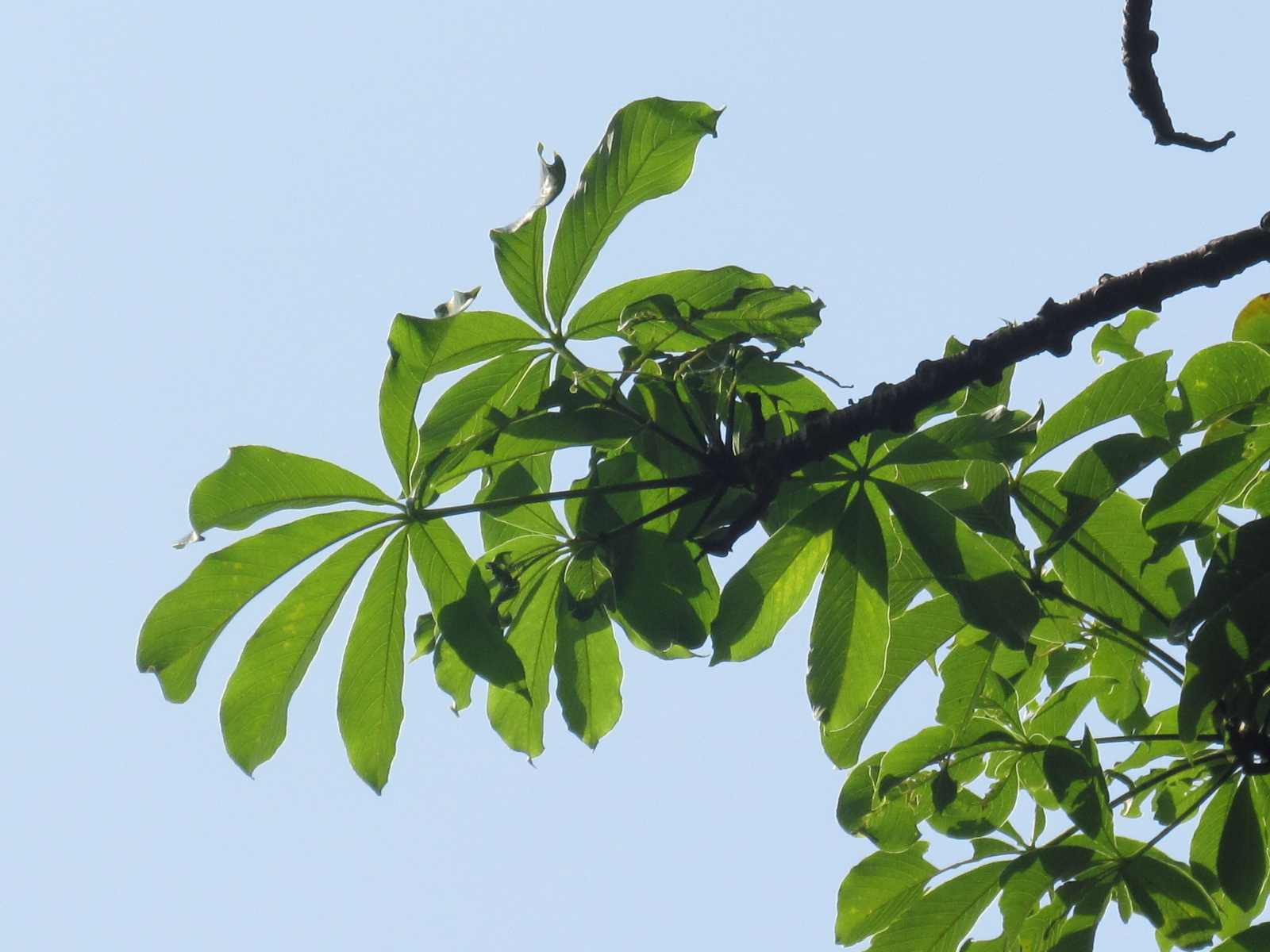
- Pseudobombax septenatum foliage

Scientific classification
- Kingdom: Plantae
- Clade: Tracheophytes
- Clade: Angiosperms
- Clade: Eudicots
- Clade: Rosids
- Order: Malvales
- Family: Malvaceae
- Genus: Pseudobombax
- Species: P. septenatum

Binomial name
- Pseudobombax septenatum (Jacq.) Dugand

Synonyms
- Bombax balanoides Ulbr.; Bombax barrigon (Seem.) Decne.; Bombax carabobense Pittier; Bombax heptaphyllum L.; Bombax septenatum Jacq.; Gossampinus heptaphylla (L.) Bakh.; Pachira barrigon Seem.

= Pseudobombax septenatum =

Species of flowering plant

Pseudobombax septenatum is of the family Malvaceae, commonly known as Algodón de río, beldaco, ceibo barrigón, majagua colorada or barrigon. It is a deciduous tree up to 80 feet (24 meters) in height which grows in semi-deciduous rainforest with a definite dry season. It is found from Nicaragua to Brazil. Its flowers are cream-colored and like those of Ceiba spp., in forming a roundish cluster of stamens on a stalk surrounding the pistel, in this instance up to one thousand stamens in number. The leaves generally have seven smooth-edged narrowly oblong leaflets. It was originally named Pachira barrigon, and later Bombax barrigon. It has the bright green lines running through the bark that is also seen in Ceiba spp.

It was first described in 1760 by the Dutch scientist Nikolaus Joseph von Jacquin as Bombax septenatum. The current name is from Armando Dugand in 1943.
