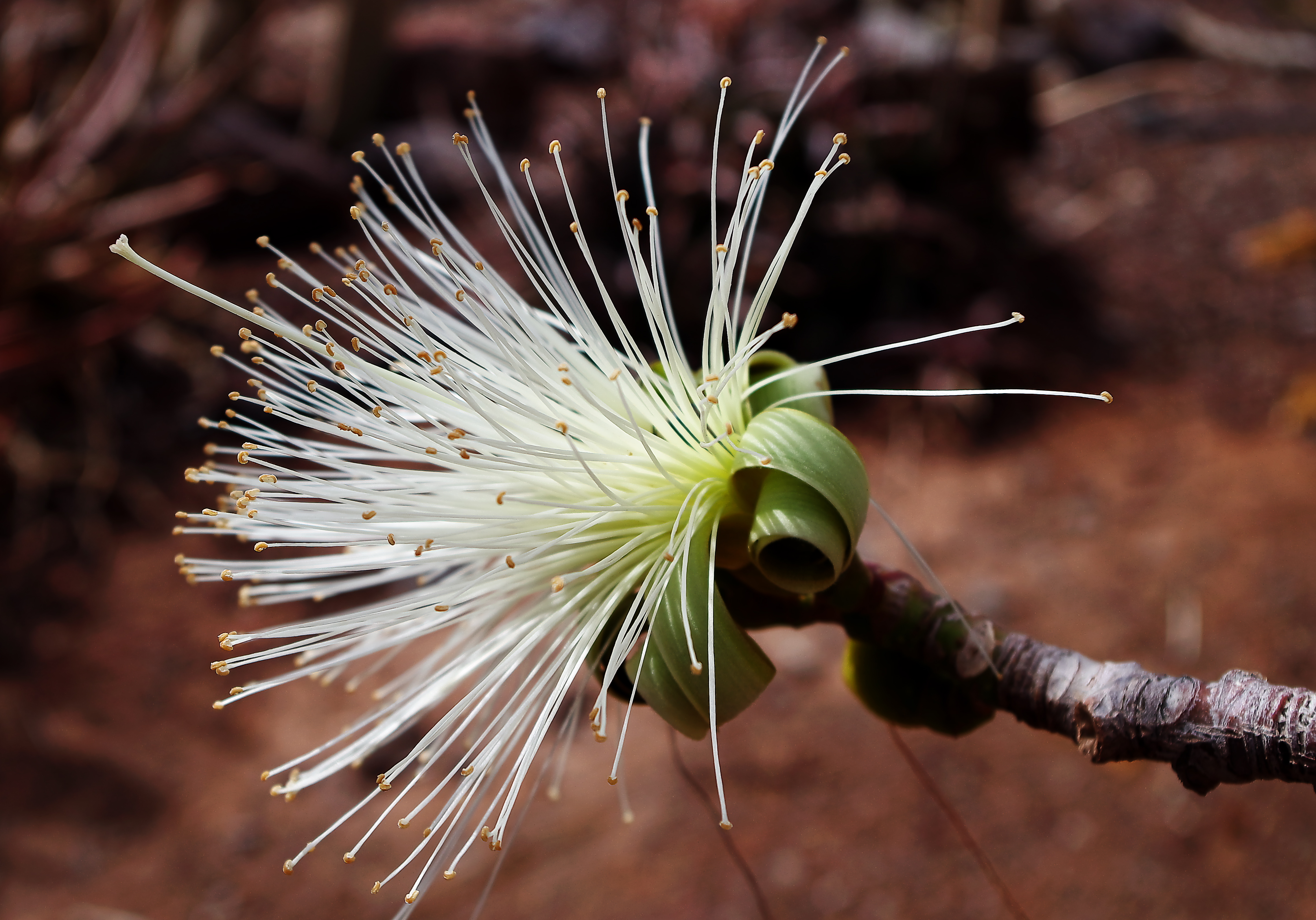
- Pseudobombax ellipticum

Scientific classification
- Kingdom: Plantae
- Clade: Tracheophytes
- Clade: Angiosperms
- Clade: Eudicots
- Clade: Rosids
- Order: Malvales
- Family: Malvaceae
- Subfamily: Bombacoideae
- Genus: Pseudobombax; Dugand

Species
- See text

= Pseudobombax =

Genus of flowering plants

Pseudobombax is a genus of flowering plants in the subfamily Bombacoideae of the family Malvaceae.

The genus ranges across tropical South America, Central America, Mexico, Cuba, Hispaniola, and the Windward Islands.

== Species ==
28 species are accepted.

- Pseudobombax andicola A.Robyns
- Pseudobombax argentinum (R.E.Fr.) A.Robyns – Soroche (Argentina, Bolivia, Brazil, Paraguay)
- Pseudobombax cajamarcanus Fern.Alonso
- Pseudobombax calcicola Carv.-Sobr. & L.P.Queiroz
- Pseudobombax campestre (Mart.) A.Robyns
- Pseudobombax cinereum Ravenna
- Pseudobombax crassipes Ravenna
- Pseudobombax croizatii A.Robyns
- Pseudobombax ellipticoideum A.Robyns
- Pseudobombax ellipticum (Kunth) Dugand – Shaving brush tree (Mexico, El Salvador, Guatemala, Honduras)
- Pseudobombax euryandrum Ravenna
- Pseudobombax furadense Gianasi & R.M.Santos
- Pseudobombax grandiflorum (Cav.) A.Robyns
- Pseudobombax longiflorum (Mart.) A.Robyns (Bolivia & Brazil)
- Pseudobombax majus (A.Robyns) Carv.-Sobr.
- Pseudobombax marginatum (A.St.-Hil.) A.Robyns
- Pseudobombax maximum A.Robyns
- Pseudobombax millei (Standl.) A.Robyns (synonym P. guayasense A.Robyns) – beldaco (Colombia, Ecuador, and Peru)
- Pseudobombax minimum Carv.-Sobr. & L.P.Queiroz
- Pseudobombax munguba (Mart.) Dugand
- Pseudobombax palmeri (S.Watson) Dugand
- Pseudobombax parvifolium Carv.-Sobr. & L.P.Queiroz
- Pseudobombax petropolitanum A.Robyns
- Pseudobombax pulchellum Carv.-Sobr.
- Pseudobombax riopretensis Ravenna
- Pseudobombax septenatum (Jacq.) Dugand
- Pseudobombax simplicifolium A.Robyns
- Pseudobombax tomentosum (Mart. & Zucc.) A.Robyns
