= Johann Christian Daniel von Schreber =

German naturalist (1739–1810)

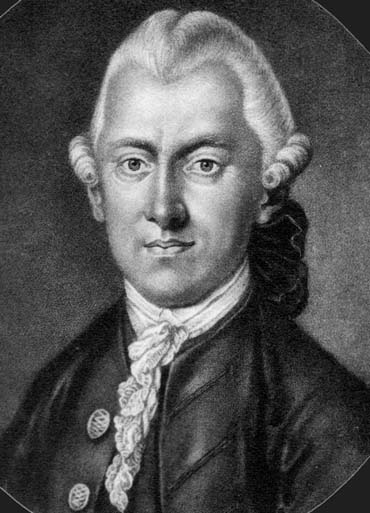
- Born: 17 January 1739; Weißensee, Thuringia
- Died: 10 December 1810 (aged 71); Erlangen
- Occupations: Naturalist, professor
- Scientific career
- Author abbrev. (botany): Schreb.

Johann Christian Daniel von Schreber (17 January 1739 – 10 December 1810), often styled J.C.D. von Schreber, was a German naturalist.

== Career ==
Schreber was appointed professor of materia medica at the University of Erlangen in 1769.

In 1774, he began writing a multivolume set of books entitled Die Säugethiere in Abbildungen nach der Natur mit Beschreibungen, which focused on the mammals of the world. Many of the animals included were given a scientific name for the first time, following the binomial system of Carl Linnaeus. From 1791 until his death in 1810, he was the president of the German Academy of Sciences Leopoldina. He was elected a member of the Royal Swedish Academy of Sciences in 1787. In April 1795, he was elected a Fellow of the Royal Society Numerous honors were bestowed on him, including the office of an imperial count palatine.

Schreber also wrote on entomology, notably Schreberi Novae Species Insectorvm. His herbarium collection has been preserved in the Botanische Staatssammlung München since 1813.

== Works ==
- Beschreibung der Gräser (1.1769 - 3.1810)
- Lithographia Halensis (1758)
- Schreberi Novae Species Insectorvm (1759)
- Die Säugetiere in Abbildungen nach der Natur mit Beschreibungen (1.1774 - 64.1804)
- Theses medicae (1761)

== Gallery ==
Plates from Die Säugetiere in Abbildungen nach der Natur mit Beschreibungen 1774-1804.

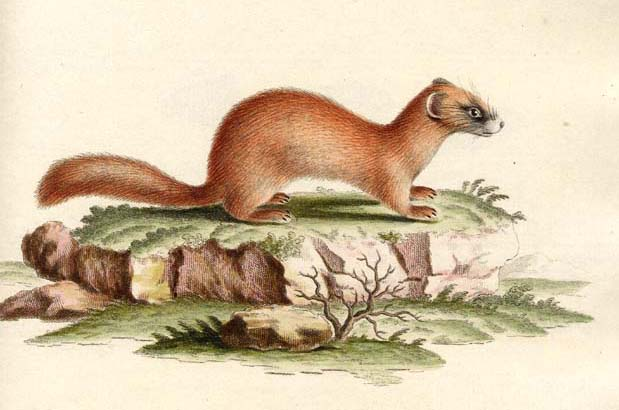
Mustela sibirica

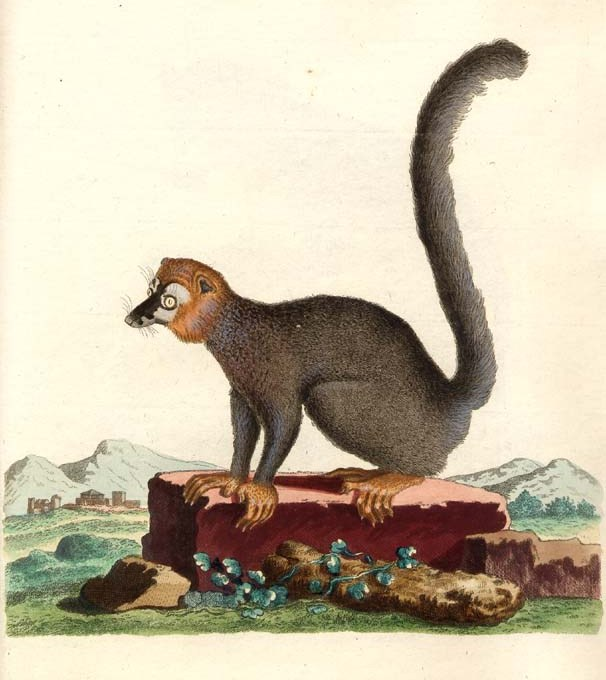
Eulemur mongoz

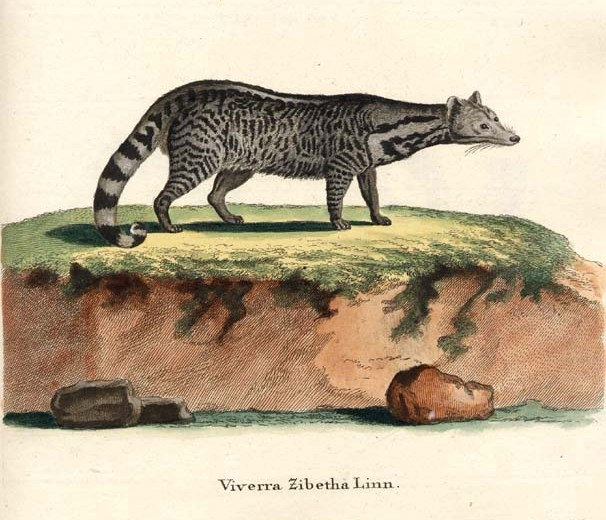
Viverra zibetha

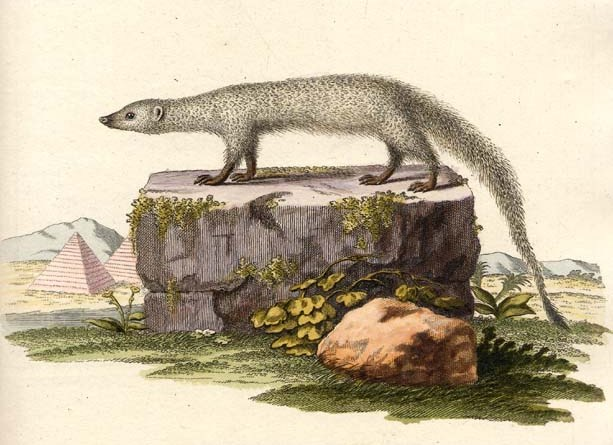
Herpestes ichneumon

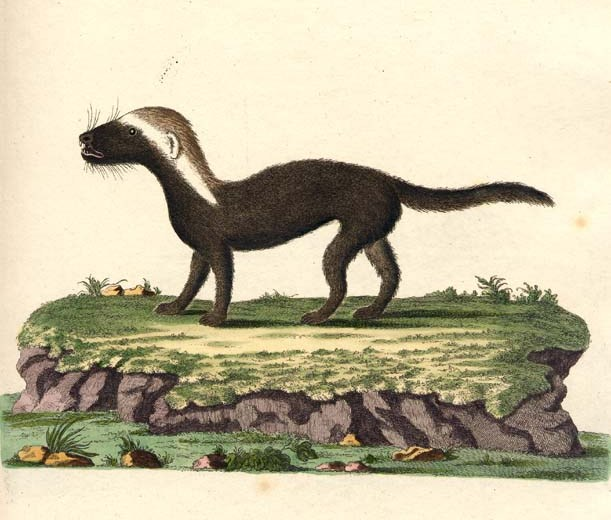
Galictis vittata

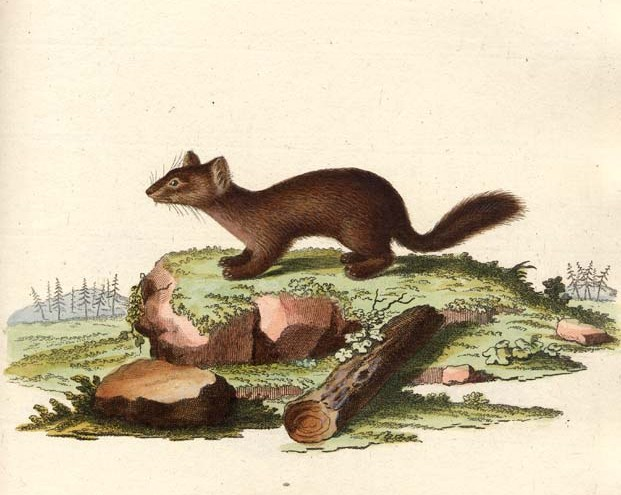
Martes zibellina

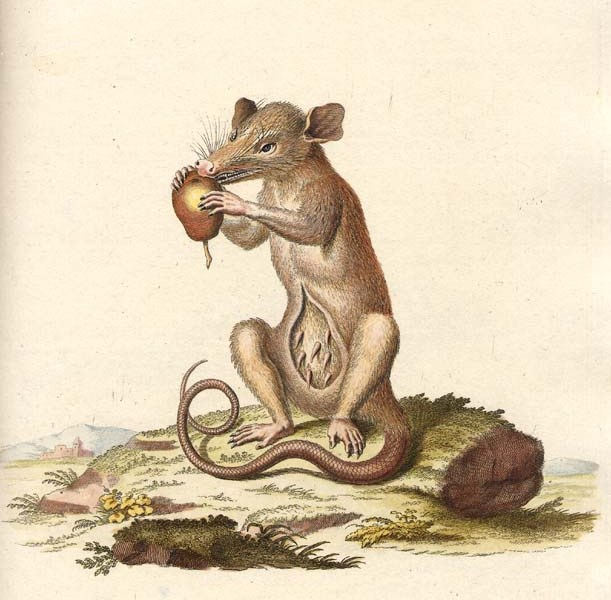
Didelphis marsupialis

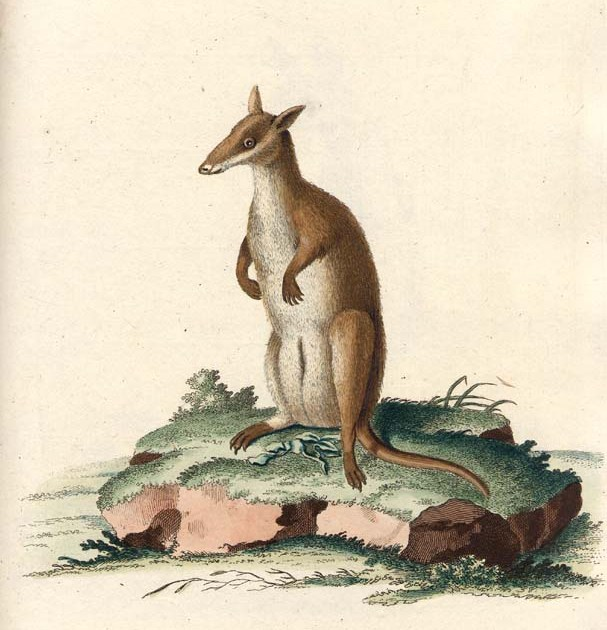
Thylogale brunii

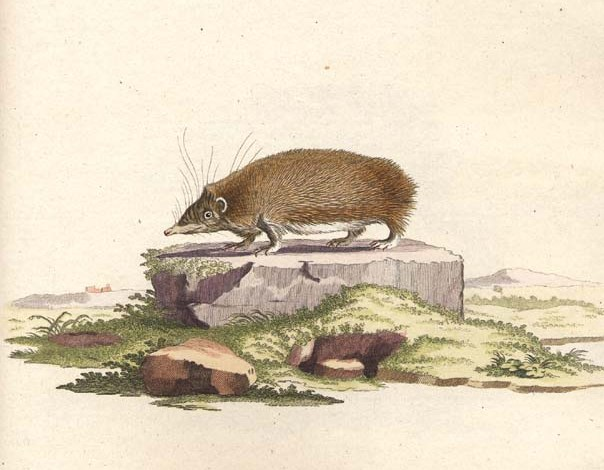
Setifer setosus

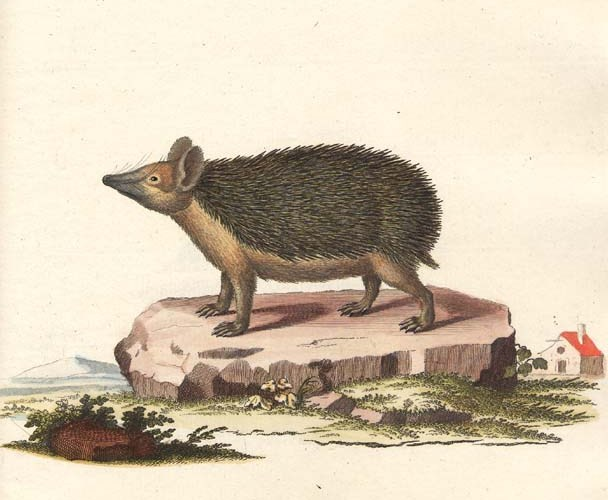
Hemiechinus auritus

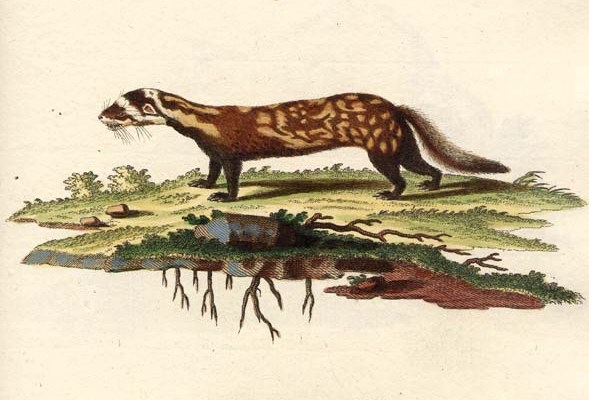
Vormela peregusna

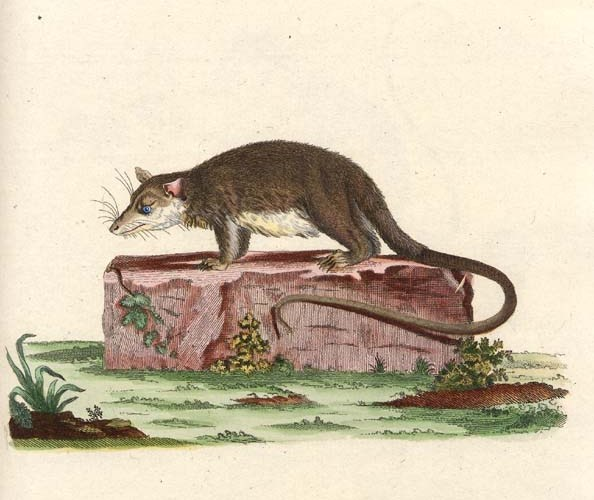
Caluromys philander
