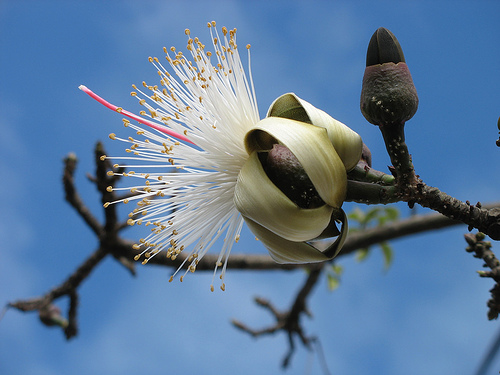

Scientific classification
- Kingdom: Plantae
- Clade: Tracheophytes
- Clade: Angiosperms
- Clade: Eudicots
- Clade: Rosids
- Order: Malvales
- Family: Malvaceae
- Genus: Pseudobombax
- Species: P. ellipticum

Binomial name
- Pseudobombax ellipticum (Kunth) Dugand

= Pseudobombax ellipticum =

Species of tree

Pseudobombax ellipticum, with common names including Coquito, is a species of plant in the subfamily Bombacoideae of the family Malvaceae.

== Distribution ==
The tree is native to southern Mexico, El Salvador, Guatemala, Hispaniola, Honduras, Nicaragua and Cuba.

== Description ==
Pseudobombax elipticum is a tree that can reach 18 m (59 ft) in height and 1.3 m (4 ft 3 in) d.b.h. Its branches are close to the base of the stem. It is a deciduous tree with succulent stems. Each of the flowers can produce hundreds of tiny black seeds (0.1 mm) that germinate within approximately 30 days.

The flowers are cotton candy pink. featuring several hundred stamens up to 12.5 cm (4.9 in) long. The flowers are fragrant and are quite sticky if peeled back.

== Uses ==
Uses include firewood and wood for carving handicrafts.

The attractive flowers are used to decorate homes and churches in Central America. In Central America, a highly intoxicating drink is made from the tree.

=== Cultivation ===
The tree is grown as an ornamental tree in Florida, Hawaii, and coastal Southern California.

== Gallery ==
Pseudobombax ellipticum

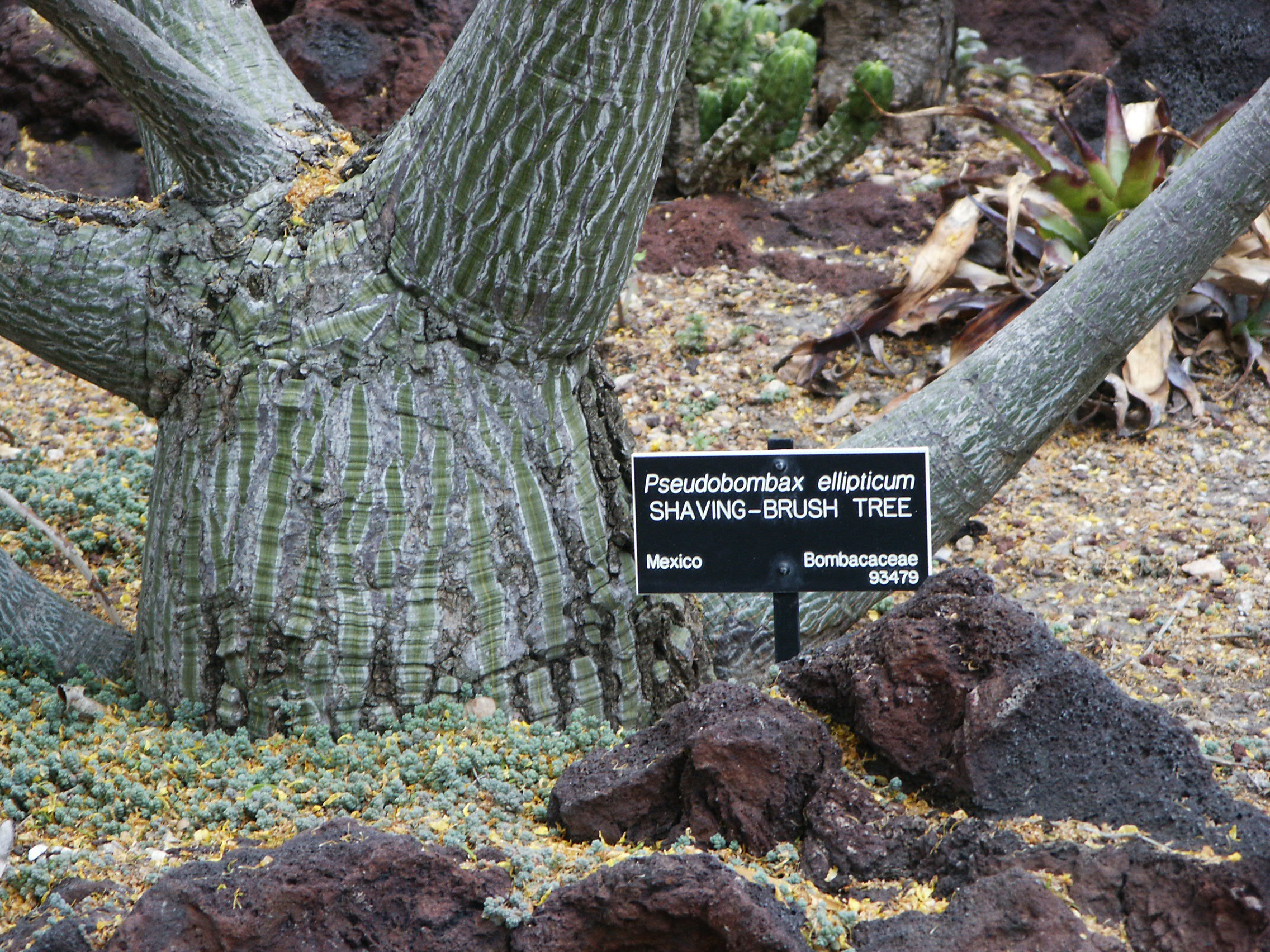
Trunk

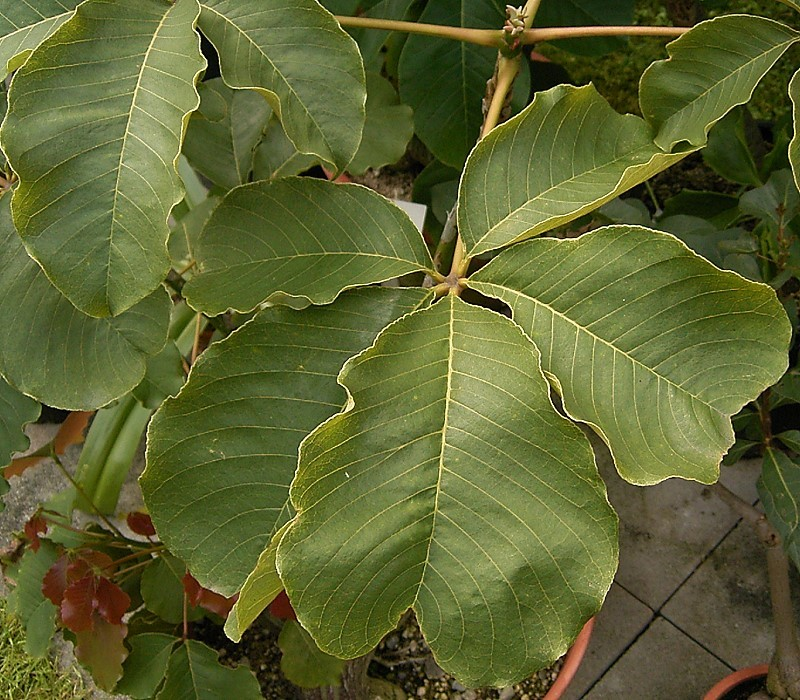
Leaves

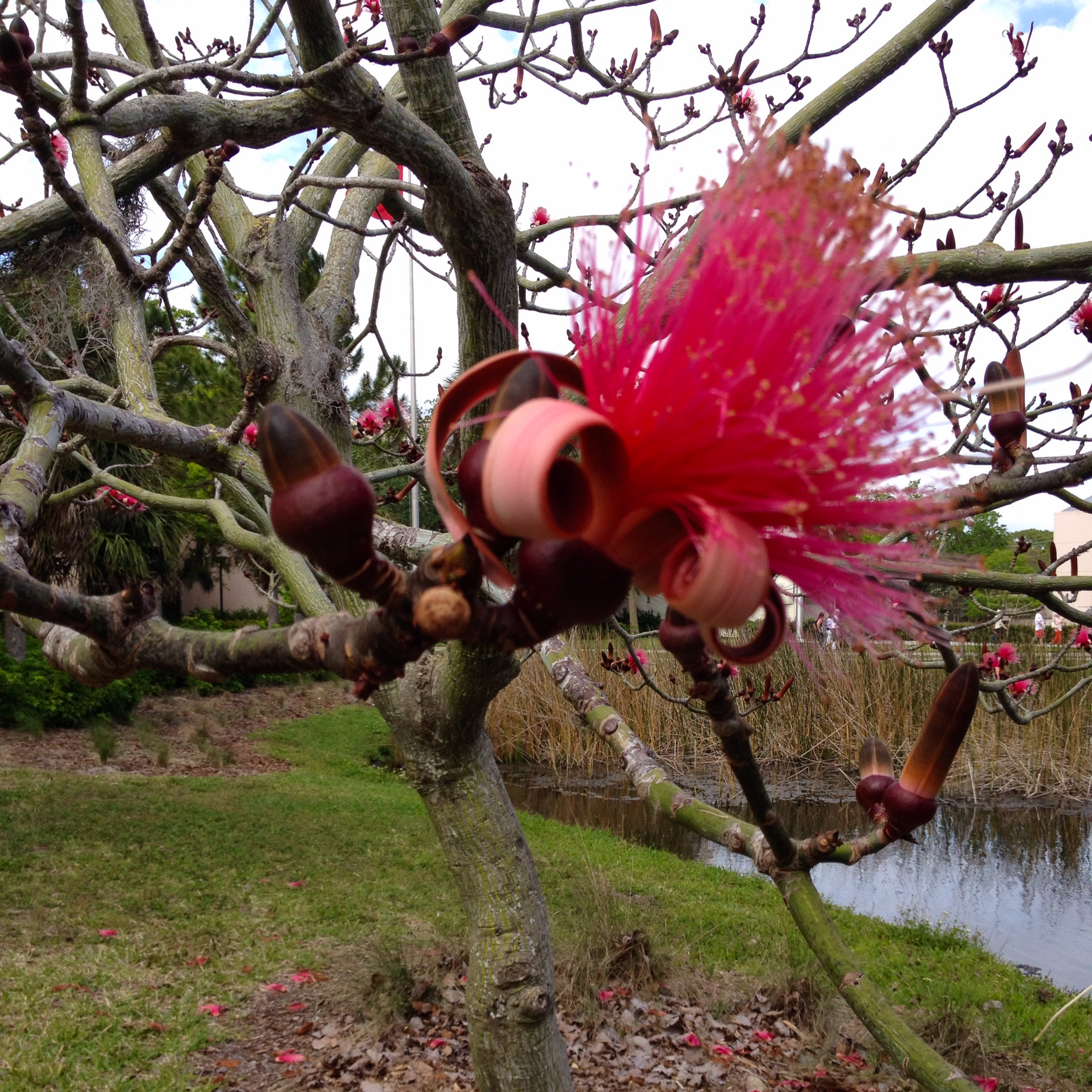
Tree and blossom

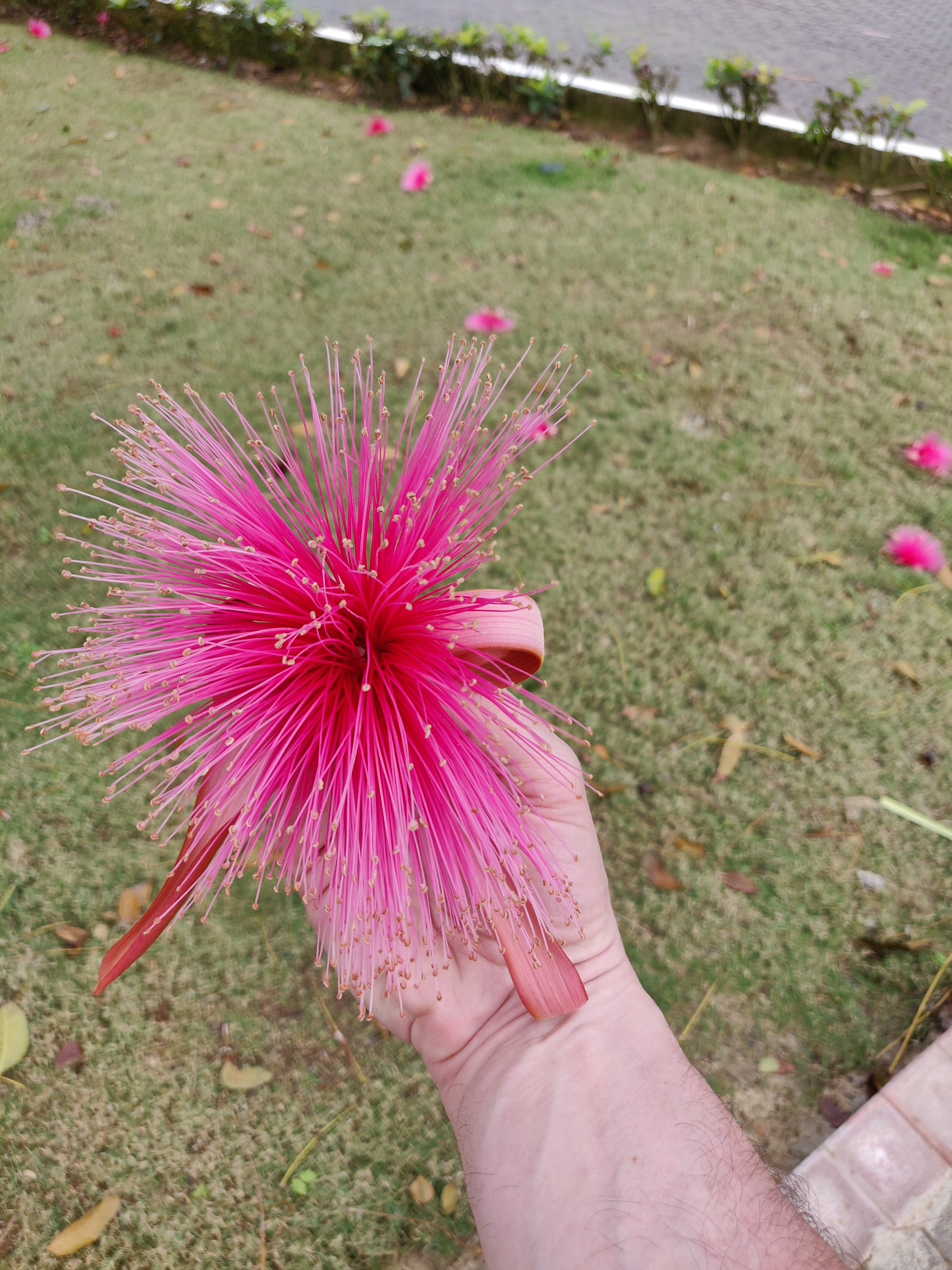
Flower in hand for scale
