= Pseudobombax argentinum =

Conservation status
- Data Deficient (IUCN 2.3)

Scientific classification
- Kingdom: Plantae
- Clade: Tracheophytes
- Clade: Angiosperms
- Clade: Eudicots
- Clade: Rosids
- Order: Malvales
- Family: Malvaceae
- Genus: Pseudobombax
- Species: P. argentinum

Binomial name
- Pseudobombax argentinum (R.E.Fr.) A.Robyns

Synonyms
- Bombax argentinum R.E.Fr.; Bombax marginatum f. argentinum (R.E.Fr.) Hassl.; Bombax marginatum f. apaense Hassl.; Bombax marginatum var. arboreum (Chodat & Hassl.) Hassl.; Bombax marginatum f. arboreum Chodat & Hassl.; Bombax marginatum var. cuspidatum Hassl.; Bombax marginatum f. fiebrigii Hassl.; Bombax marginatum f. fruticosa Chodat & Hassl.; Bombax marginatum var. intermedium Hassl.; Bombax marginatum subsp. meridionale Hassl.; Bombax marginatum f. paraguayense (R.E.Fr.) Hassl.; Bombax marginatum var. praecox Hassl.; Bombax marginatum f. rupestre Hassl.; Bombax paraguayense R.E.Fr.

Species of flowering plant

Pseudobombax argentinum, the soroche, is a species of flowering plant in the family Malvaceae. It is found in Argentina, Bolivia, Brazil, and Paraguay. It is threatened by habitat loss.
