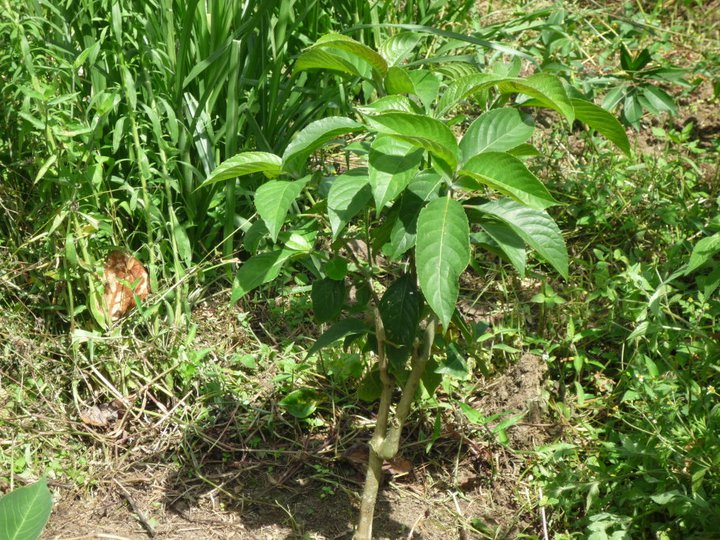

Scientific classification
- Kingdom: Plantae
- Clade: Tracheophytes
- Clade: Angiosperms
- Clade: Eudicots
- Clade: Asterids
- Order: Lamiales
- Family: Acanthaceae
- Genus: Trichanthera
- Species: T. gigantea

Binomial name
- Trichanthera gigantea (Bonpl.) Nees

= Trichanthera gigantea =

Genus of trees

Trichanthera gigantea is a species of flowering plant in the acanthus family, Acanthaceae. It is native to Central America and northern South America. It has also been introduced to other tropical regions such as Vietnam, Cambodia, and the Philippines.

== Description ==
Trichanthera gigantea grows as a shrub or tree up to 5 meters tall, though a 15-meter specimen was reported once. It often produces aerial roots. The oval or oblong leaves are up to 26 centimeters long by 14 wide and are borne on short petioles. The flower is maroon with a yellow throat. It is bell-shaped and the throat measures up to 2.5 centimeters long. The plant blooms in the afternoon and the flowers fall away during the night. The flowers are pollinated by bats. The bat Glossophaga soricina has been seen at the flowers of this species.

== Uses ==
This plant is cultivated as an animal fodder and fed to ducks, pigs, and rabbits. Its leaves are relatively rich in protein. It has veterinary uses in Colombia, where it has been used to treat horse colic and retained placenta in cows. This plant also has many uses for humans. It has uses in human medicine, including as a supplement to increase lactation in nursing mothers. It is used as a living fence and a shade tree.
