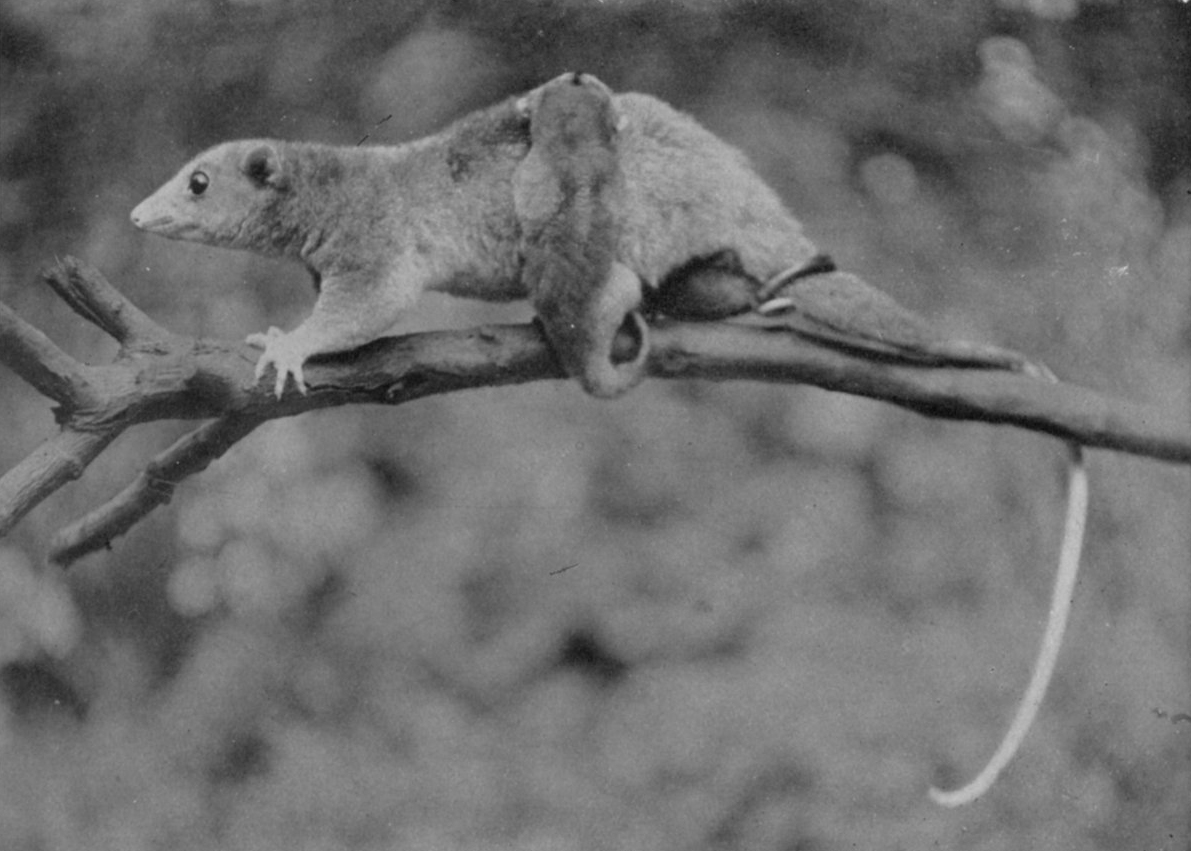
- Woolly opossum with juvenile

Scientific classification
- Domain: Eukaryota
- Kingdom: Animalia
- Phylum: Chordata
- Class: Mammalia
- Infraclass: Marsupialia
- Order: Didelphimorphia
- Family: Didelphidae
- Subfamily: Caluromyinae
- Genus: Caluromys; J. A. Allen, 1900

Type species
- Didelphis philander Linnaeus, 1758

Species
- Caluromys derbianus; Caluromys lanatus; Caluromys philander

= Woolly opossum =

Woolly opossums

Genus of marsupials

The three species in the genus Caluromys, commonly known as woolly opossums, are members of the order Didelphimorphia.

== Species and subspecies ==
- Subgenus Mallodelphys
  - Derby's woolly opossum, Caluromys derbianus
    - Caluromys derbianus aztecus
    - Caluromys derbianus centralis
    - Caluromys derbianus derbianus
    - Caluromys derbianus fervidus
    - Caluromys derbianus nauticus
    - Caluromys derbianus pallidus
  - Brown-eared woolly opossum, Caluromys lanatus
    - Caluromys lanatus cicur
    - Caluromys lanatus lanatus
    - Caluromys lanatus nattereri
    - Caluromys lanatus ochropus
    - Caluromys lanatus orntus
    - Caluromys lanatus vitalinus
- Subgenus Caluromys
  - Bare-tailed woolly opossum, Caluromys philander
    - Caluromys philander affinis
    - Caluromys philander dichurus
    - Caluromys philander philander
    - Caluromys philander trinitatis
