= Kalinowski's mouse opossum =

Conservation status
- Least Concern (IUCN 3.1)

Scientific classification
- Kingdom: Animalia
- Phylum: Chordata
- Class: Mammalia
- Infraclass: Marsupialia
- Order: Didelphimorphia
- Family: Didelphidae
- Subfamily: Hyladelphinae; Voss & Jansa, 2009
- Genus: Hyladelphys; Voss, Lunde, & Simmons, 2001
- Species: H. kalinowskii

Binomial name
- Hyladelphys kalinowskii (Hershkovitz, 1992)
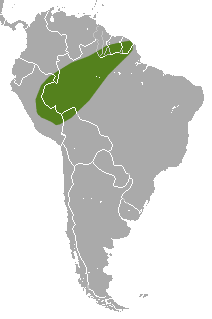
- Kalinowski's mouse opossum range

Synonyms
- Gracilinanus kalinowskii Hershkovitz, 1992

Species of marsupial

Kalinowski's mouse opossum or the Peru gracile mouse opossum (Hyladelphys kalinowskii) is a species of opossum in the family Didelphidae. It is found in Brazil, French Guiana, Guyana, and Peru. Its natural habitat is subtropical or tropical moist lowland forests at elevations up to 1000 m.

This is the only living species in the genus Hyladelphys. It was removed from the genus Gracilinanus in 2001.
