= List of mammals of the Solomon Islands =

This is a list of the mammal species recorded in the Solomon Islands. The geographical area covered by this article refers to the archipelago of the Solomon Islands, which includes Bougainville, an autonomous region of Papua New Guinea, as well as the group of islands that make up the nation state of Solomon Islands. Within this area there are sixty-three mammal species of which four are critically endangered, one is endangered, and fifteen are vulnerable.

Three of the species listed for the Solomon Islands are considered to be extinct.

The marine mammals of the order Cetacea that have been identified in the Pacific Ocean is described in the literature review by Miller (2006) and by the Secretariat of the Pacific Regional Environment Programme (SPREP). A revision of the list of cetaceans reported in the ocean surrounding the Solomon Islands was carried by Miller (2009).

The following tags are used to highlight each species' conservation status as assessed by the International Union for Conservation of Nature:

EX	Extinct	No reasonable doubt that the last individual has died.
EW	Extinct in the wild	Known only to survive in captivity or as a naturalised populations well outside its previous range.
CR	Critically endangered	The species is in imminent risk of extinction in the wild.
EN	Endangered	The species is facing an extremely high risk of extinction in the wild.
VU	Vulnerable	The species is facing a high risk of extinction in the wild.
NT	Near threatened	The species does not meet any of the criteria that would categorise it as risking extinction but it is likely to do so in the future.
LC	Least concern	There are no current identifiable risks to the species.
DD	Data deficient	There is inadequate information to make an assessment of the risks to this species.

== Order: Sirenia (manatees and dugongs) ==
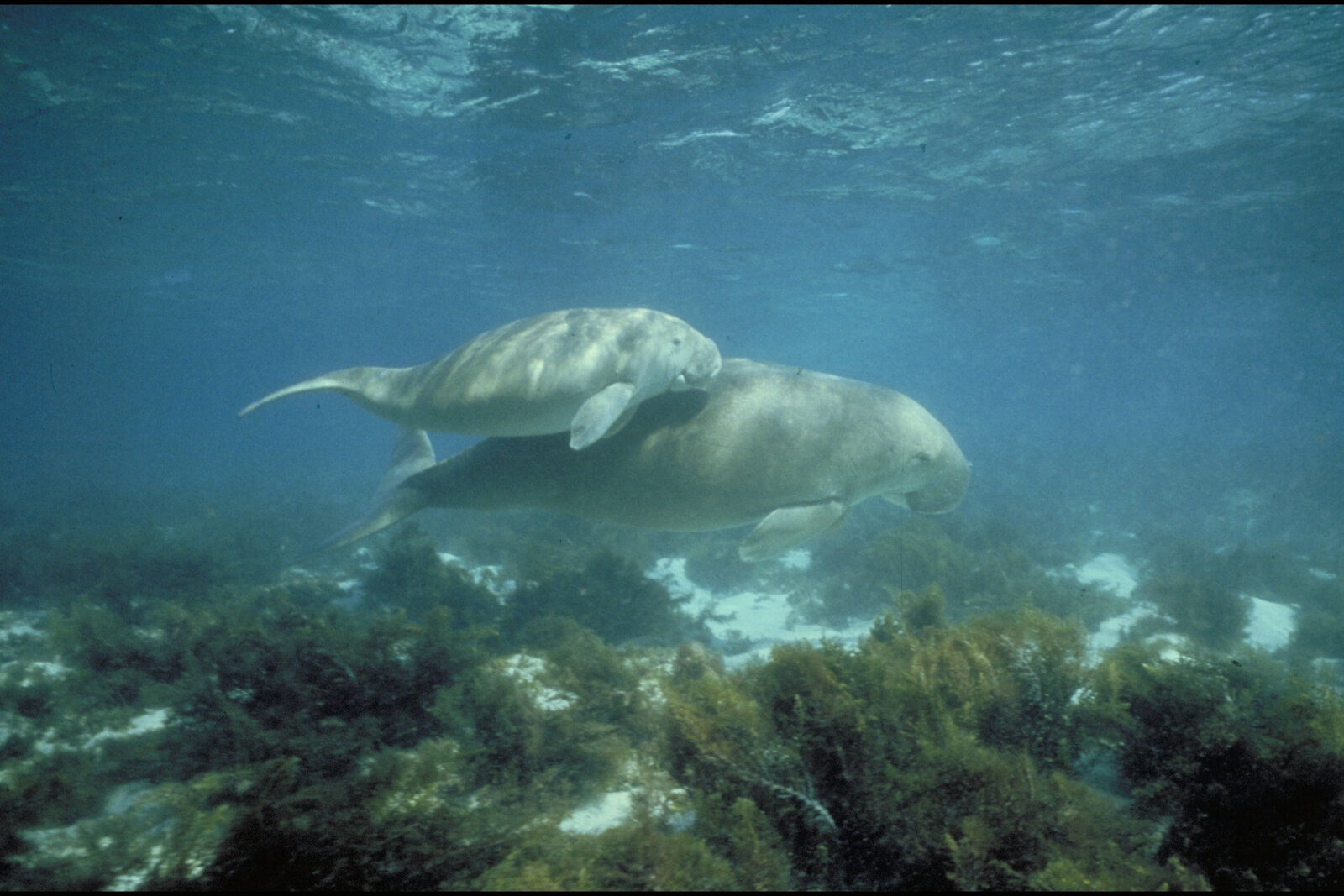
Dugongs

Sirenia is an order of fully aquatic, herbivorous mammals that inhabit rivers, estuaries, coastal marine waters, swamps, and marine wetlands. All four species are endangered.

- Family: Dugongidae
  - Genus: Dugong
    - Dugong, Dugong dugon VU

== Order: Rodentia (rodents) ==
Rodents make up the largest order of mammals, with over 40% of mammalian species. They have two incisors in the upper and lower jaw which grow continually and must be kept short by gnawing. Most rodents are small though the capybara can weigh up to 45 kg (99 lb).

- Suborder: Myomorpha
  - Family: Muridae (mice, rats, gerbils, etc.)
    - Subfamily: Murinae
      - Genus: Rattus
        - Spiny rat, Rattus praetor LC
      - Genus: Solomys
        - Poncelet's naked-tailed rat, Solomys ponceleti EN
        - Florida naked-tailed rat, Solomys salamonis VU
        - Bougainville naked-tailed rat, Solomys salebrosus EN
        - Isabel naked-tailed rat, Solomys sapientis VU
      - Genus: Uromys
        - Emperor rat, Uromys imperator EX
        - Guadalcanal rat, Uromys porculus EX
        - King rat, Uromys rex CR

== Order: Chiroptera (bats) ==
The bats' most distinguishing feature is that their forelimbs are developed as wings, making them the only mammals capable of flight. Bat species account for about 20% of all mammals.

- Family: Pteropodidae (flying foxes, Old World fruit bats)
  - Subfamily: Pteropodinae
    - Genus: Dobsonia
      - Solomon's naked-backed fruit bat, Dobsonia inermis LC
    - Genus: Nyctimene
      - Common tube-nosed fruit bat, Nyctimene albiventer LC
      - Island tube-nosed fruit bat, Nyctimene major LC
      - Malaita tube-nosed fruit bat, Nyctimene malaitensis VU
      - Nendo tube-nosed fruit bat, Nyctimene sanctacrucis EX
      - Umboi tube-nosed fruit bat, Nyctimene vizcaccia LC
    - Genus: Pteralopex
      - Bougainville monkey-faced bat, Pteralopex anceps CR
      - Guadalcanal monkey-faced bat, Pteralopex atrata CR
      - Montane monkey-faced bat, Pteralopex pulchra CR
      - New Georgian monkey-faced bat, Pteralopex taki EN
    - Genus: Pteropus
      - Admiralty flying-fox, Pteropus admiralitatum LC
      - Ontong Java flying fox, Pteropus howensis VU
      - Small flying-fox, Pteropus hypomelanus LC
      - Lesser flying-fox, Pteropus mahaganus VU
      - Temotu flying fox, Pteropus nitendiensis VU
      - Solomons flying-fox, Pteropus rayneri NT
      - Santa Cruz flying fox, Pteropus sanctacrucis VU
      - Insular flying-fox, Pteropus tonganus LC
      - Vanikoro flying fox, Pteropus tuberculatus VU
      - Dwarf flying fox, Pteropus woodfordi VU
  - Subfamily: Macroglossinae
    - Genus: Macroglossus
      - Long-tongued nectar bat, Macroglossus minimus LC
    - Genus: Melonycteris
      - Orange fruit bat, Melonycteris aurantius VU
      - Fardoulis's blossom bat, Melonycteris fardoulisi VU
      - Woodford's fruit bat, Melonycteris woodfordi LC
- Family: Vespertilionidae
  - Subfamily: Myotinae
    - Genus: Myotis
      - Large-footed bat, Myotis adversus LC
  - Subfamily: Vespertilioninae
    - Genus: Pipistrellus
      - Angulate pipistrelle, Pipistrellus angulatus LC
  - Subfamily: Miniopterinae
    - Genus: Miniopterus
      - Intermediate long-fingered bat, Miniopterus medius LC
      - Schreibers' long-fingered bat, Miniopterus schreibersii LC
      - Great bent-winged bat, Miniopterus tristis LC
- Family: Molossidae
  - Genus: Chaerephon
    - Solomons mastiff bat, Chaerephon solomonis LC
- Family: Emballonuridae
  - Genus: Emballonura
    - Large-eared sheath-tailed bat, Emballonura dianae VU
    - Raffray's sheath-tailed bat, Emballonura raffrayana LC
  - Genus: Mosia
    - Dark sheath-tailed bat, Mosia nigrescens LC
  - Genus: Saccolaimus
    - Naked-rumped pouched bat, Saccolaimus saccolaimus LC
- Family: Rhinolophidae
  - Subfamily: Hipposiderinae
    - Genus: Anthops
      - Flower-faced bat, Anthops ornatus VU
    - Genus: Aselliscus
      - Temminck's trident bat, Aselliscus tricuspidatus LC
    - Genus: Hipposideros
      - Spurred roundleaf bat, Hipposideros calcaratus LC
      - Makira roundleaf bat, Hipposideros demissus VU
      - Fierce roundleaf bat, Hipposideros dinops DD

== Order: Diprotodontia (marsupials) ==
The Diprotodontia are an order of about 125 species of marsupial mammals including the kangaroos, wallabies, possums, koala, wombats, and many others.

- Suborder: Phalangeriformes
  - Family: Phalangeridae
    - Genus: Phalanger
      - Northern common cuscus, Phalanger orientalis LC (Introduced)
    - Genus: Spilocuscus
      - Common spotted cuscus, Spilocuscus maculatus LC
  - Family: Pseudocheiridae
    - Genus: Pseudochirulus
      - Lowland ringtail possum, Pseudochirulus canescens LC
    - Genus: Pseudochirops
      - Golden ringtail possum, Pseudochirops corrinae NT
  - Family: Petauridae
    - Genus: Dactylopsila
      - Striped possum, Dactylopsila trivirgata LC
    - Genus: Petaurus
      - Sugar glider, Petaurus breviceps LC

== Order: Cetacea (whales) ==
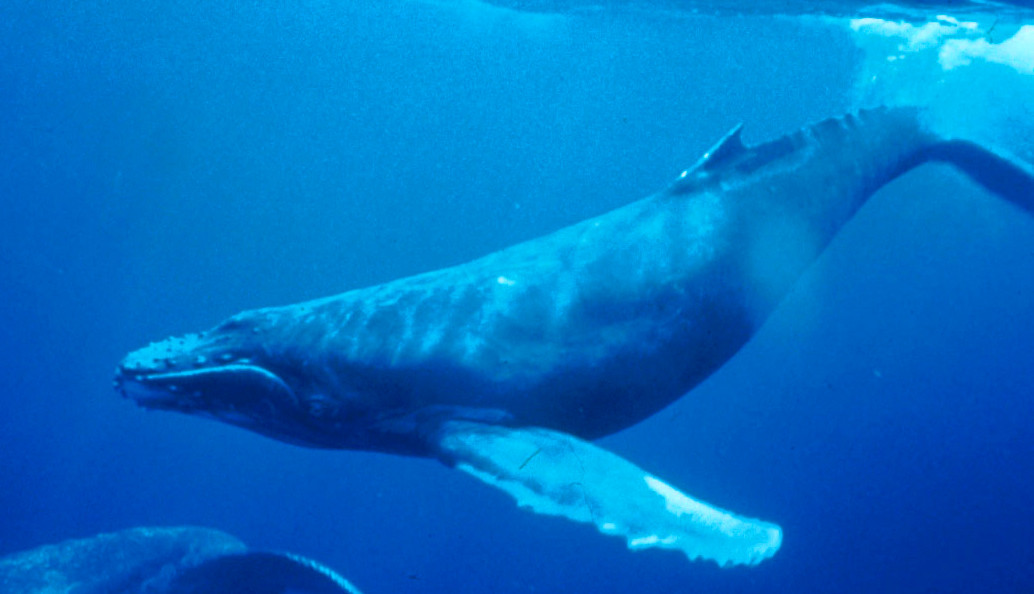
Humpback whale

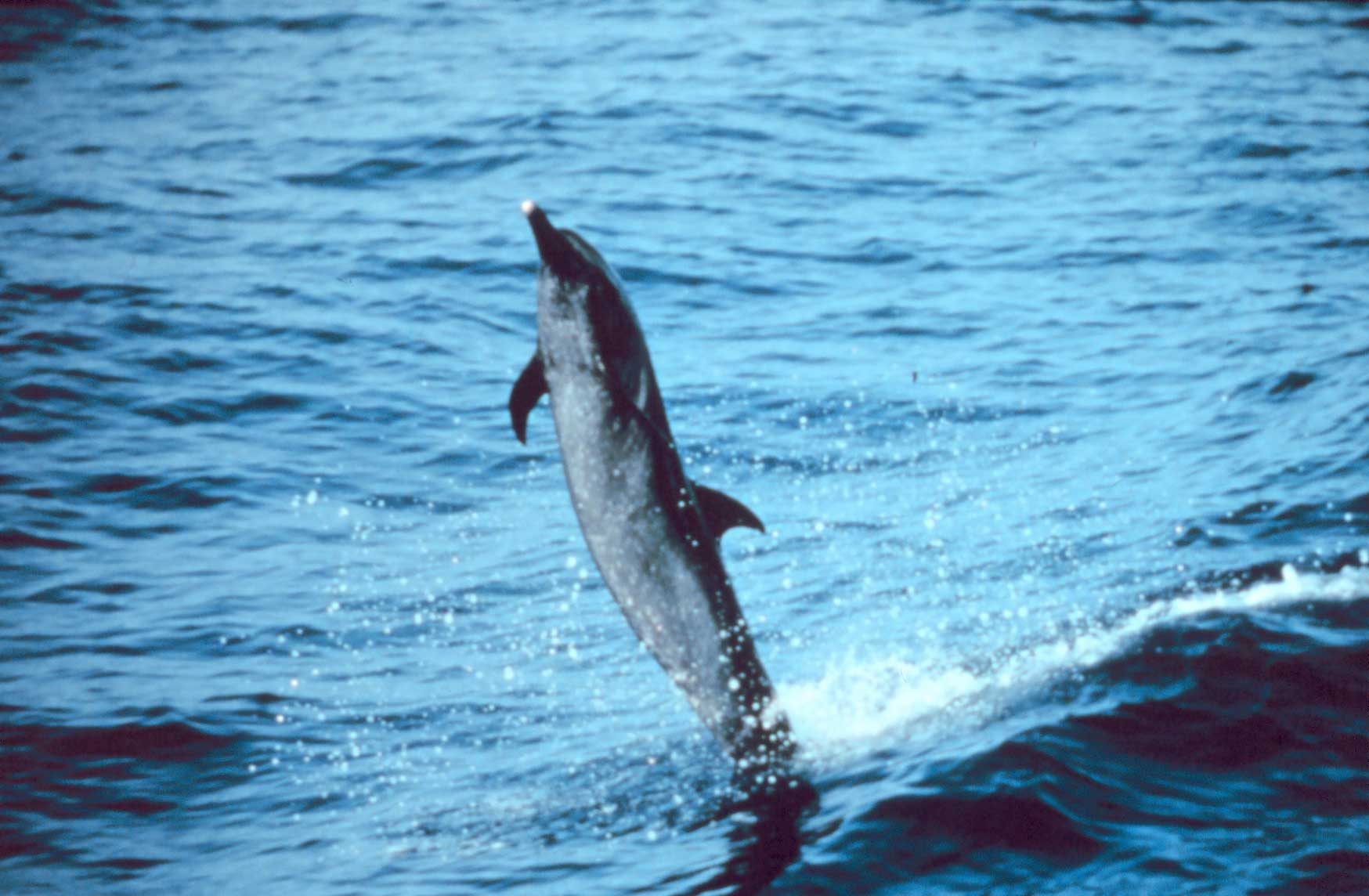
Pantropical spotted dolphin

The order Cetacea includes whales, dolphins and porpoises. They are the mammals most fully adapted to aquatic life with a spindle-shaped nearly hairless body, protected by a thick layer of blubber, and forelimbs and tail modified to provide propulsion underwater.

- Suborder: Mysticeti
  - Family: Balaenopteridae
    - Subfamily: Balaenopterinae
      - Genus: Balaenoptera
        - Rorqual baleen whale: either Bryde's whale, Balaenoptera brydei or sei whale, B. borealis DD
    - Subfamily: Megapterinae
      - Genus: Megaptera
        - Humpback whale, Megaptera novaeangliae VU
- Suborder: Odontoceti
  - Superfamily: Platanistoidea
    - Family: Ziphidae
      - Subfamily: Hyperoodontinae
        - Genus: Mesoplodon
          - Blainville's beaked whale, Mesoplodon densirostris DD
    - Family: Physeteridae
      - Genus: Physeter
        - Sperm whale, Physeter macrocephalus vulnerable species VU
    - Family: Delphinidae (marine dolphins)
      - Genus: Peponocephala
        - Melon-headed whale, Peponocephala electra LC (now rarely found in the Solomon Islands)
      - Genus: Globicephala
        - Short-finned pilot whale, Globicephala macrorhynchus DD
      - Genus: Steno
        - Rough-toothed dolphin, Steno bredanensis LC
      - Genus: Stenella
        - Pantropical spotted dolphin, Stenella attenuata LC
        - Striped dolphin, Stenella coeruleoalba LC
        - Spinner dolphin, Stenella longirostris DD
      - Genus: Lagenodelphis
        - Fraser's dolphin, Lagenodelphis hosei LC
      - Genus: Grampus
        - Risso's dolphin, Grampus griseus LC
      - Genus: Tursiops
        - Common bottlenose dolphin, Tursiops truncatus LC
        - Indo-Pacific bottlenose dolphin, Tursiops aduncus NT
      - Genus: Feresa
        - Pygmy killer whale, Feresa attenuata DD
      - Genus: Pseudorca
        - False killer whale, Pseudorca crassidens DD
      - Genus: Orcinus
        - Orca, Orcinus orca DD

== See also ==
- List of chordate orders
- List of mammals described in the 2000s
- List of prehistoric mammals
- Lists of mammals by region
- Mammal classification
