= List of mammals of Fiji =

This is a list of the mammal species recorded in Fiji. There are fifteen mammal species in Fiji, of which one is critically endangered, one is endangered, and three are vulnerable.

The following tags are used to highlight each species' conservation status as assessed by the International Union for Conservation of Nature:

EX	Extinct	No reasonable doubt that the last individual has died.
EW	Extinct in the wild	Known only to survive in captivity or as a naturalized populations well outside its previous range.
CR	Critically endangered	The species is in imminent risk of extinction in the wild.
EN	Endangered	The species is facing an extremely high risk of extinction in the wild.
VU	Vulnerable	The species is facing a high risk of extinction in the wild.
NT	Near threatened	The species does not meet any of the criteria that would categorise it as risking extinction but it is likely to do so in the future.
LC	Least concern	There are no current identifiable risks to the species.
DD	Data deficient	There is inadequate information to make an assessment of the risks to this species.

== Order: Carnivora (carnivorans) ==
There are over 260 species of carnivorans, the majority of which eat meat as their primary dietary item. They have a characteristic skull shape and dentition.

- Family: Herpestidae
  - Genus: Urva
    - Indian brown mongoose, U. fusca, LC, introduced
    - Small Indian mongoose, U. auropunctata LC introduced

== Order: Chiroptera (bats) ==
The bats' most distinguishing feature is that their forelimbs are developed as wings, making them the only mammals capable of flight. Bat species account for about 20% of all mammals.

- Family: Pteropodidae (flying foxes, Old World fruit bats)
  - Subfamily: Pteropodinae
    - Genus: Mirimiri
      - Fijian monkey-faced bat, Mirimiri acrodonta CR
    - Genus: Pteropus
      - Samoa flying-fox, Pteropus samoensis NT
      - Insular flying-fox, Pteropus tonganus LC
  - Subfamily: Macroglossinae
    - Genus: Notopteris
      - Long-tailed fruit bat, Notopteris macdonaldi VU
- Family: Molossidae
  - Genus: Chaerephon
    - Chaerephon bregullae EN
- Family: Emballonuridae
  - Genus: Emballonura
    - Polynesian sheath-tailed bat, Emballonura semicaudata EN

== Order: Cetacea (whales) ==
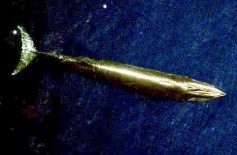
Bryde's whale

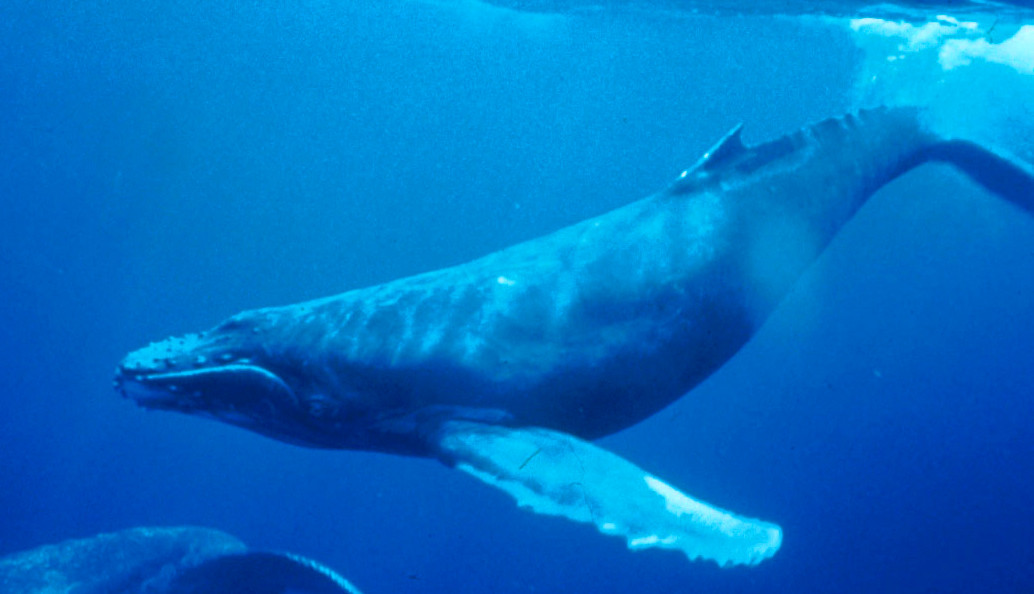
Humpback whale

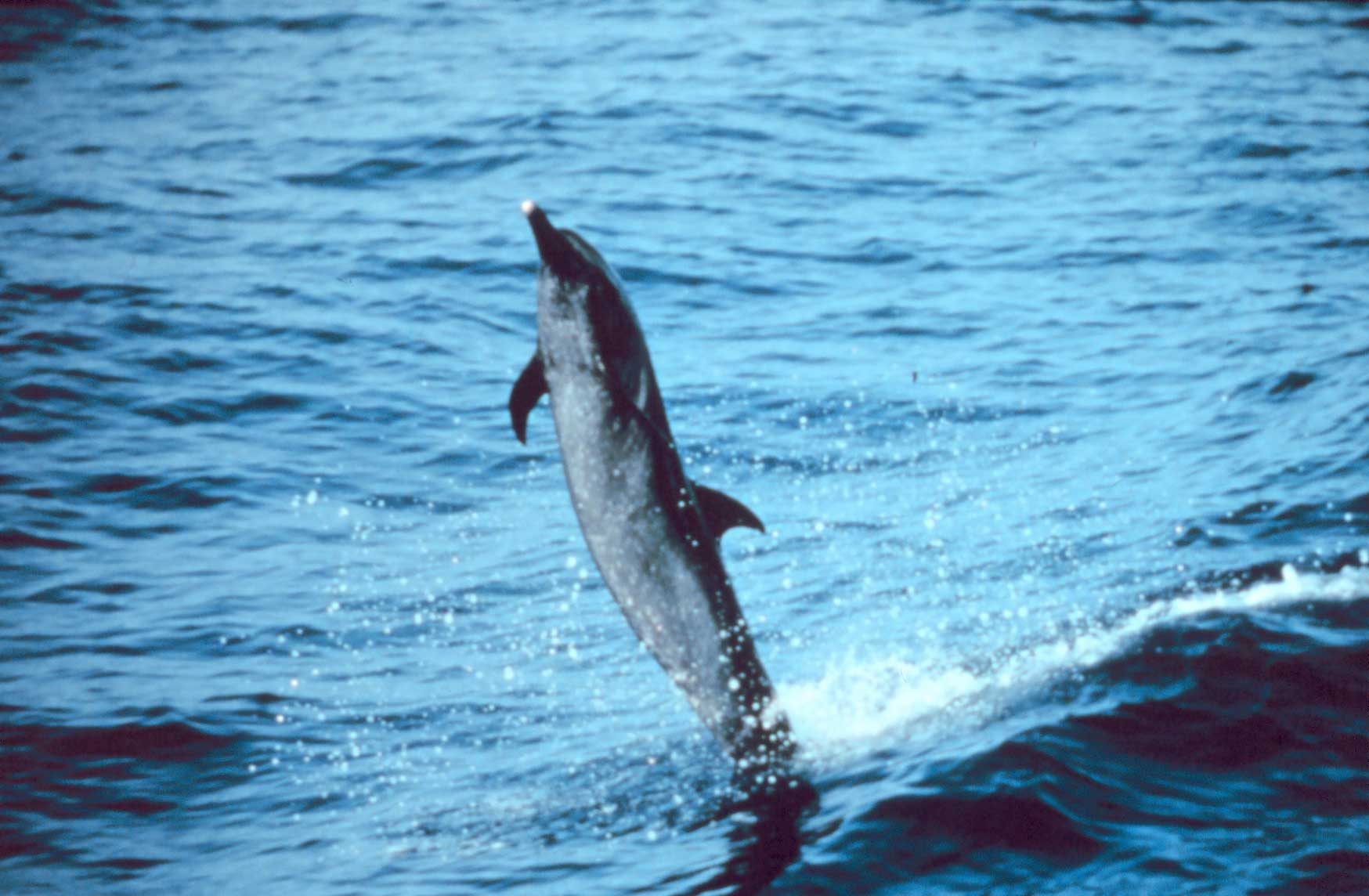
Pantropical spotted dolphin

The order Cetacea includes whales, dolphins and porpoises. They are the mammals most fully adapted to aquatic life with a spindle-shaped nearly hairless body, protected by a thick layer of blubber, and forelimbs and tail modified to provide propulsion underwater.

- Suborder: Mysticeti
  - Family: Balaenopteridae
    - Subfamily: Balaenopterinae
      - Genus: Balaenoptera
        - Dwarf minke whale, Balaenoptera acutorostrata LC
        - Bryde's whale, Balaenoptera edeni DD
        - Fin whale, Balaenoptera physalus EN
        - Pygmy blue whale, Balaenoptera musculus intermedia CR
    - Subfamily: Megapterinae
      - Genus: Megaptera
        - Humpback whale, Megaptera novaeangliae LC
- Suborder: Odontoceti
  - Family Physeteridae (sperm whales)
    - Genus: Physeter
      - Sperm whale, Physeter catodon VU
    - Family: Kogiidae
      - Genus: Kogia
        - Pygmy sperm whale, Kogia breviceps DD
    - Family: Ziphidae
      - Subfamily: Hyperoodontinae
        - Genus: Mesoplodon
          - Blainville's beaked whale, Mesoplodon densirostris DD
          - Ginkgo-toothed beaked whale, Mesoplodon ginkgodens DD
          - Hector's beaked whale, Mesoplodon hectori DD
    - Family: Delphinidae (marine dolphins)
      - Genus: Stenella
        - Pantropical spotted dolphin, Stenella attenuata LC
      - Genus: Lagenodelphis
        - Fraser's dolphin, Lagenodelphis hosei LC
      - Genus: Feresa
        - Pygmy killer whale, Feresa attenuata DD

== See also ==
- List of chordate orders
- Lists of mammals by region
- List of prehistoric mammals
- Mammal classification
- List of mammals described in the 2000s
