= List of mammals of Vanuatu =

This is a list of the mammal species recorded in Vanuatu. There are 22 mammal species in Vanuatu, of which one is endangered and four are vulnerable.

The following tags are used to highlight each species' conservation status as assessed by the International Union for Conservation of Nature:

EX	Extinct	No reasonable doubt that the last individual has died.
EW	Extinct in the wild	Known only to survive in captivity or as a naturalized populations well outside its previous range.
CR	Critically endangered	The species is in imminent risk of extinction in the wild.
EN	Endangered	The species is facing an extremely high risk of extinction in the wild.
VU	Vulnerable	The species is facing a high risk of extinction in the wild.
NT	Near threatened	The species does not meet any of the criteria that would categorise it as risking extinction but it is likely to do so in the future.
LC	Least concern	There are no current identifiable risks to the species.
DD	Data deficient	There is inadequate information to make an assessment of the risks to this species.

Some species were assessed using an earlier set of criteria. Species assessed using this system have the following instead of near threatened and least concern categories:

LR/cd	Lower risk/conservation dependent	Species which were the focus of conservation programmes and may have moved into a higher risk category if that programme was discontinued.
LR/nt	Lower risk/near threatened	Species which are close to being classified as vulnerable but are not the subject of conservation programmes.
LR/lc	Lower risk/least concern	Species for which there are no identifiable risks.

== Order: Sirenia (manatees and dugongs) ==
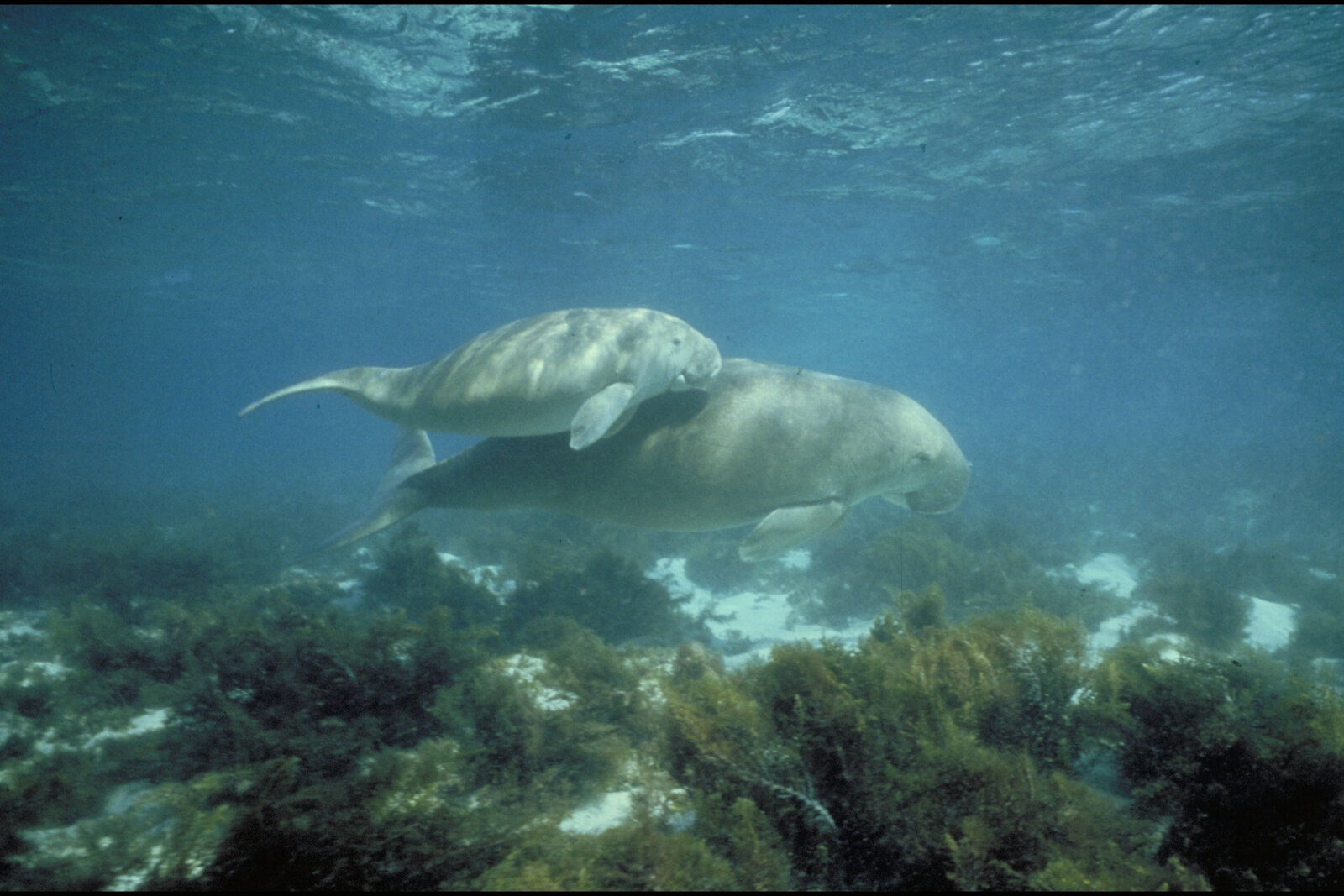
Dugongs

Sirenia is an order of fully aquatic, herbivorous mammals that inhabit rivers, estuaries, coastal marine waters, swamps, and marine wetlands. All four species are endangered.

  - Family: Dugongidae
    - Genus: Dugong
      - Dugong, Dugong dugon VU

== Order: Chiroptera (bats) ==
The bats' most distinguishing feature is that their forelimbs are developed as wings, making them the only mammals capable of flight. Bat species account for about 20% of all mammals.

  - Family: Pteropodidae (flying foxes, Old World fruit bats)
    - Subfamily: Pteropodinae
      - Genus: Pteropus
        - Vanuatu flying fox, Pteropus anetianus LR/lc
        - Banks flying fox, Pteropus fundatus VU
        - Insular flying-fox, Pteropus tonganus LR/lc
    - Subfamily: Macroglossinae
      - Genus: Notopteris
        - Long-tailed fruit bat, Notopteris macdonaldi VU
  - Family: Vespertilionidae
    - Subfamily: Myotinae
      - Genus: Myotis
        - Large-footed bat, Myotis adversus LR/lc
    - Subfamily: Miniopterinae
      - Genus: Miniopterus
        - Little long-fingered bat, Miniopterus australis LR/lc
        - Great bent-winged bat, Miniopterus tristis LR/lc
  - Family: Molossidae
    - Genus: Chaerephon
      - Chaerephon bregullae LR/nt
      - Northern freetail bat, Chaerephon jobensis LR/lc
  - Family: Emballonuridae
    - Genus: Emballonura
      - Polynesian sheath-tailed bat, Emballonura semicaudata EN
  - Family: Rhinolophidae
    - Subfamily: Hipposiderinae
      - Genus: Aselliscus
        - Temminck's trident bat, Aselliscus tricuspidatus LR/lc
      - Genus: Hipposideros
        - Fawn roundleaf bat, Hipposideros cervinus LR/lc

== Order: Cetacea (whales) ==
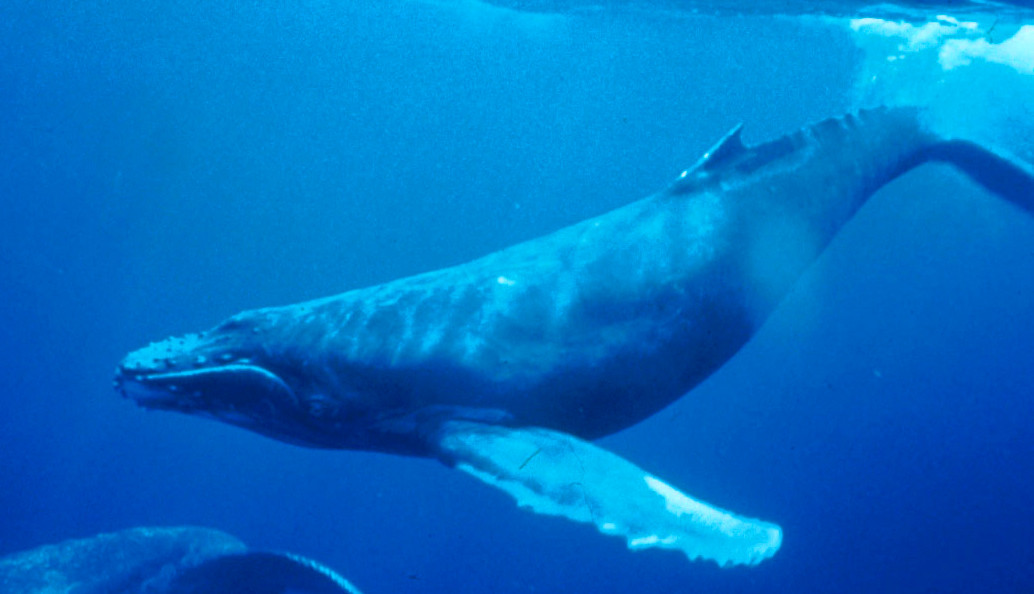
Humpback whale

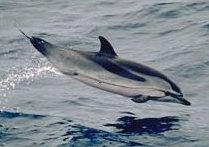
Striped dolphin

The order Cetacea includes whales, dolphins and porpoises. They are the mammals most fully adapted to aquatic life with a spindle-shaped nearly hairless body, protected by a thick layer of blubber, and forelimbs and tail modified to provide propulsion underwater.

- Suborder: Mysticeti
  - Family: Balaenopteridae
    - Subfamily: Megapterinae
      - Genus: Megaptera
        - Humpback whale, Megaptera novaeangliae VU
- Suborder: Odontoceti
  - Superfamily: Platanistoidea
    - Family: Ziphidae
      - Subfamily: Hyperoodontinae
        - Genus: Mesoplodon
          - Blainville's beaked whale, Mesoplodon densirostris DD
          - Ginkgo-toothed beaked whale, Mesoplodon ginkgodens DD
          - Hector's beaked whale, Mesoplodon hectori DD
    - Family: Delphinidae (marine dolphins)
      - Genus: Stenella
        - Pantropical spotted dolphin, Stenella attenuata LR/cd
        - Striped dolphin, Stenella coeruleoalba LR/cd
        - Spinner dolphin, Stenella longirostris LR/cd
      - Genus: Lagenodelphis
        - Fraser's dolphin, Lagenodelphis hosei DD

== See also ==
- List of chordate orders
- Lists of mammals by region
- List of prehistoric mammals
- Mammal classification
- List of mammals described in the 2000s
