= Solomon Islands (ecoregion) =

Marine and terrestrial ecoregion of the Pacific Ocean

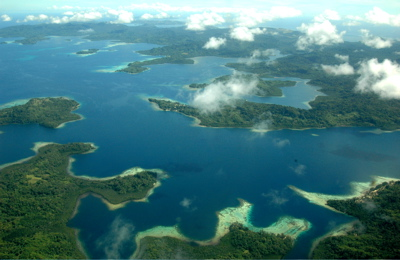
- Aerial view of islands in the Solomon Islands (archipelago)

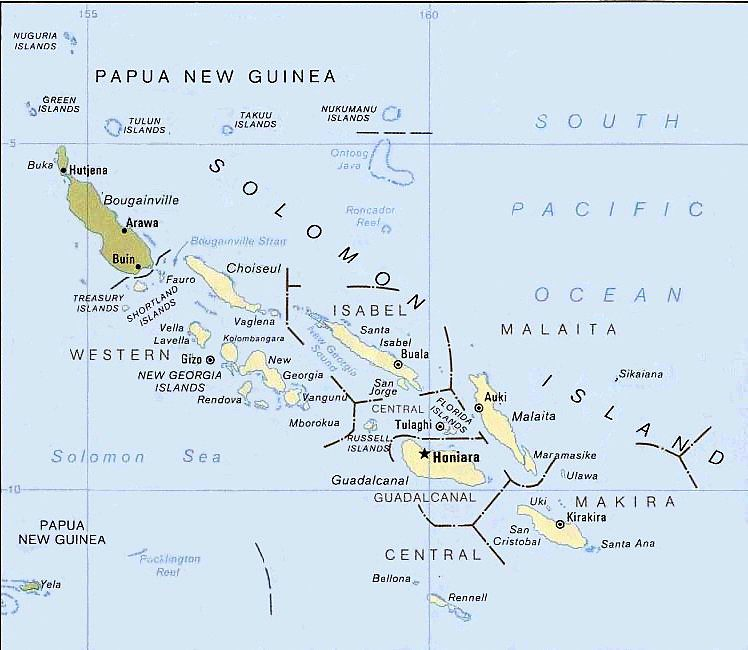
- The Solomon Islands (archipelago)

Geography
- Location: Pacific Ocean
- Coordinates: 9°28′S 159°49′E
- Archipelago: Solomon Islands (archipelago)
- Total islands: Six main islands and more than 986 smaller islands
- Major islands: Bougainville, Choiseul, the New Georgia Islands, Santa Isabel, Malaita, Makira (San Cristobal), Guadalcanal.

Administration
- Papua New Guinea (Bougainville); Solomon Islands

The Solomon Islands (archipelago) covers a marine and terrestrial ecoregion (sometimes referred to as the Solomon Archipelago) in the Pacific Ocean. It includes the nation of Solomon Islands, Bougainville Island and Buka Island of Papua New Guinea and their surrounding tropical ocean waters the waters but excluding the Santa Cruz Islands, which are a part of the Vanuatu marine ecoregion with the forests being part of the Vanuatu rain forests ecoregion.

Bougainville is the largest island in the archipelago, while it is geographically part of the Solomon Archipelago, it is politically an autonomous region of Papua New Guinea.

The Solomon Islands rain forests form part of the East Melanesian Islands ecoregion, also known as the Solomons-Vanuatu-Bismarck moist forests, which is a biogeographic region in the Melanesia subregion of Oceania.

== Key Biodiversity Areas ==
In the Solomon Islands, there are 28 land-based and 24 marine-protected areas formally recognised (PIPAP 2016). The Pacific Islands Protected Areas Portal (PIPAP 2021) states that 530.42 km^{2} (204.80 mi^{2}) out of 29,191.65 km^{2} (11,270.96 mi^{2}) (1.82%) of the total land area of Solomon Islands is protected, while 1,879.38 km^{2} (725.63 mi^{2}) out of 1,609,756.55 km^{2} (621,530.48 mi^{2}) (0.12%) of the total marine area is protected.

The protected areas in the Solomon Archipelago include: Arnavon Community Marine Conservation Area, Kolombangara Forest Reserve, Makira Highlands Conservation Area and Komarindi Catchment Conservation Area on Guadalcanal. There are 36 Key Biodiversity Areas identified for the Solomon archipelago, including Kunua Plains and Mount Balbi on Bougainville Island, Mount Maetambe – Kolombangara River Important Bird Area on Choiseul Island, Kolombangara Upland Forest, Guadalcanal Watersheds, Nendö Island and Marovo Kavachi, a submarine volcano known as Kavachi, which is 28 km (20 mi) to the south of Vangunu.

== Tropical forests of the Solomon Archipelago ==
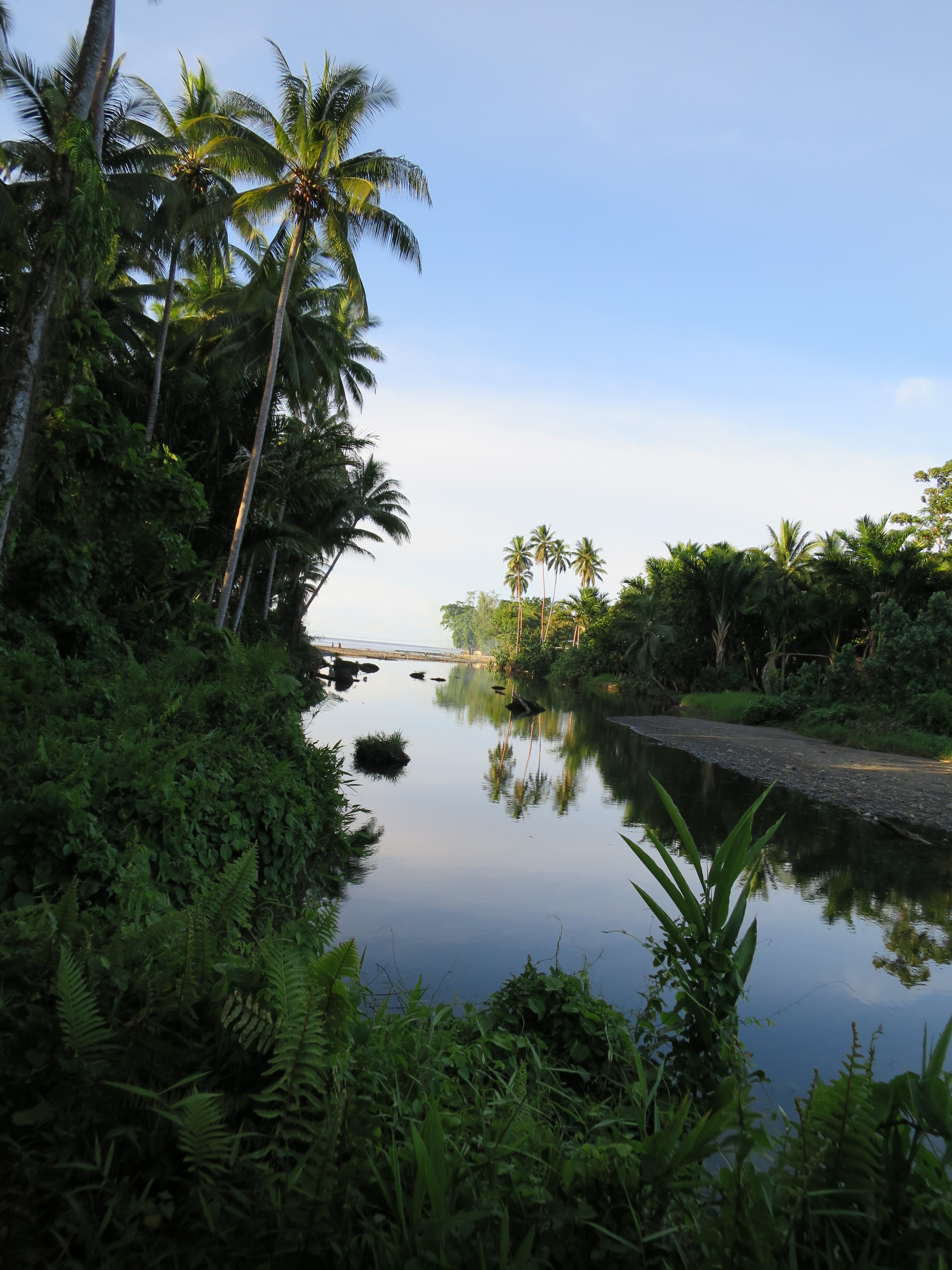
Kirakira River and Beach, Makira

This ecoregion consists of tropical lowland and montane forests on oceanic islands. The islands are predominantly hill forest, although only a few of the islands are higher than 1,000 metres (3,281 ft) in elevation. The vegetation types in this ecoregion, include mangrove forests and saline swamp forests, coastal strand vegetation, freshwater swamp, riverine forests, different types of lowland rain forests and montane rain forest. The Solomon Islanders use trees from different forest types for housing, food and medicinal purposes. Large areas of the natural forest below 400 metres (1,312 ft) have been logged or are planned to be logged. Forest clearing for subsistence agriculture also reduces the amount of natural forest.

Seasonally dry forest and grassland is found only on the leeward (north) side of Guadalcanal as the result of the “rain shadow” caused by the mountains of Guadalcanal which are higher than 2,000 metres (6,562 ft) in elevation.

== Coral Triangle ==
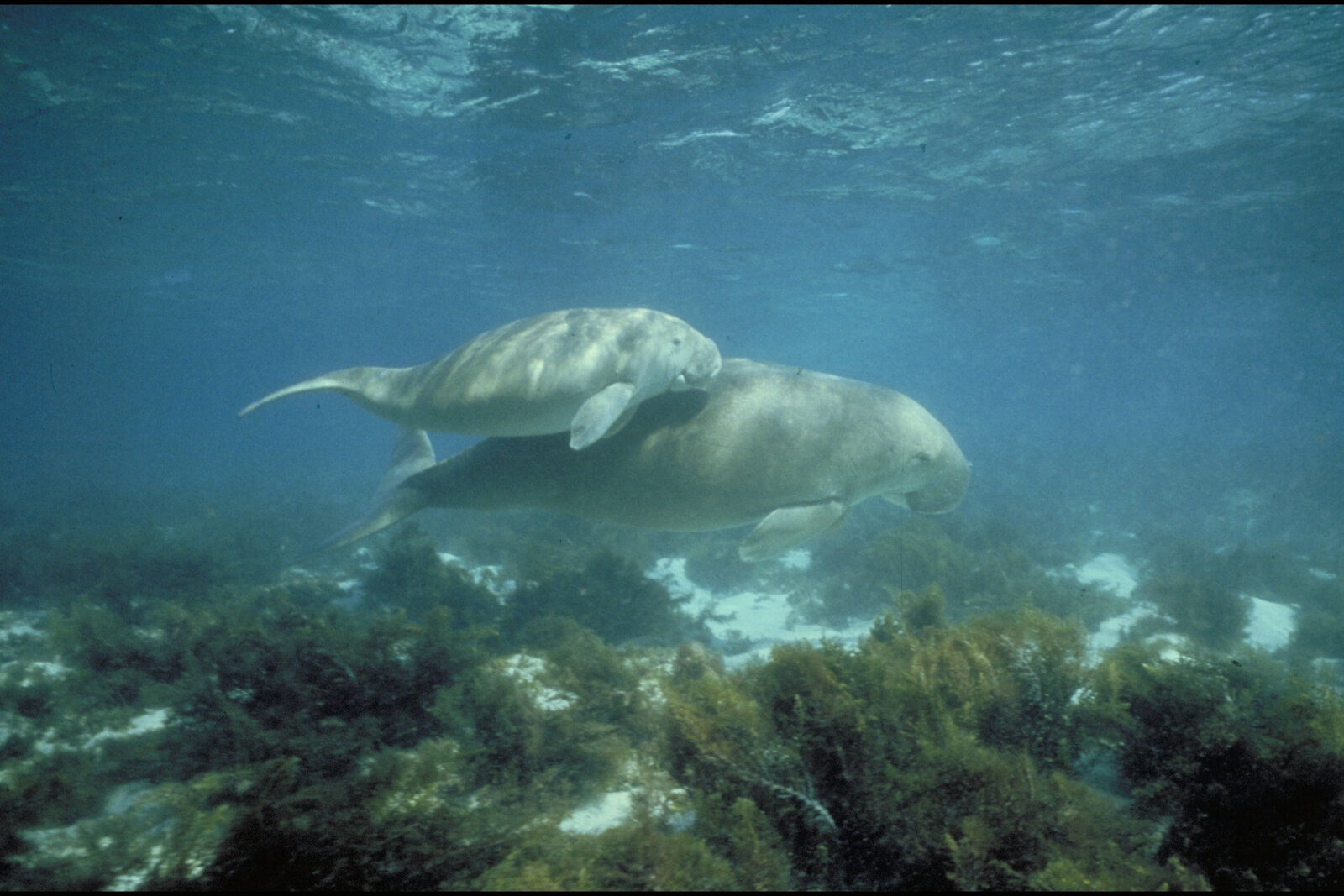
A dugong mother and calf in shallow water

Fringing reefs are located around the coast of the mountainous high islands of the Solomon Archipelago including: Choiseul, the Shortland Islands, the New Georgia Islands, Santa Isabel, the Russell Islands, the Florida Islands, Tulagi, Malaita, Maramasike, Ulawa, Owaraha (Santa Ana), Makira (San Cristobal), and the main island of Guadalcanal.

According to the WWF/Nature Conservancy system, the Solomon Archipelago is part of the Eastern Coral Triangle marine province of the Central Indo-Pacific marine realm.

The Solomon archipelago has a rich and diverse marine life, including coral reefs and seagrass meadows. The archipelago is part of the Coral Triangle, the region of the western Pacific with world's greatest diversity of corals and coral reef species. The baseline survey of marine biodiversity in 2004, identified 494 coral species, including nine potentially new species and extended the known range of 122 coral species to include the Solomons. The 2004 survey also recorded 1,019 species of reef fish, of which 47 were species range extensions.

Dugongs are found in the seagrass meadows and near-shore waters.

== Reptiles ==
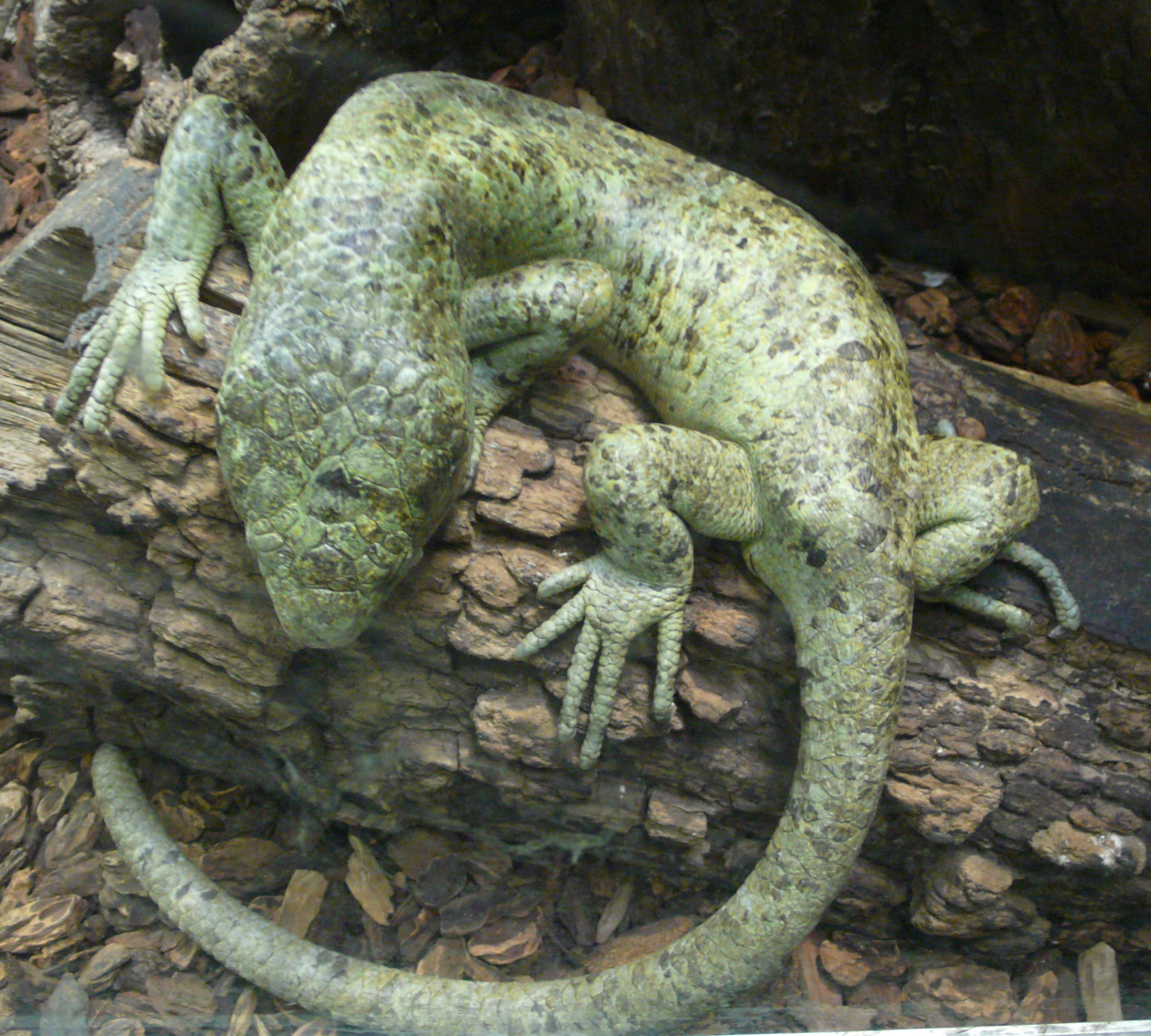
Solomon Islands skink

Lizards are the most diverse group of reptiles in the Solomon Archipelago, and within the lizards there are several different types: skinks (including the Solomon Islands skink or prehensile tailed skink Corucia zebrata and Poncelet’s crocodile skink Tribolonotus ponceleti, which are endemic to the Solomon archipelago), geckos, varanids (or ‘monitors’), and agamids (or ‘dragons’) of the genus Hydrosaurus.

Different snake species are found in the Solomon Archipelago, ranging from those that live in the ocean (sea kraits and sea snakes), those that live in moist conditions underground or in rotting logs and leaf litter (blind snakes Acutotyphlops), and those that are found in the trees (South Pacific tree boa, the brown tree snake Boiga irregularis and the Solomons tree snake Dendrelaphis calligastra). The sea kraits, and two other terrestrial species, the Solomons Red Krait Salomonelaps par and the Solomons Black-banded krait Loveridgelaps elapoides, are members of the cobra family (Elapidae) and are considered dangerous due to their toxic venom.

One species of crocodile, the saltwater crocodile (Crocodylus porosus) is found in mangrove swamps, rivers and tidal estuaries, and also in the open ocean.

== The mammalian species of the Solomon archipelago ==
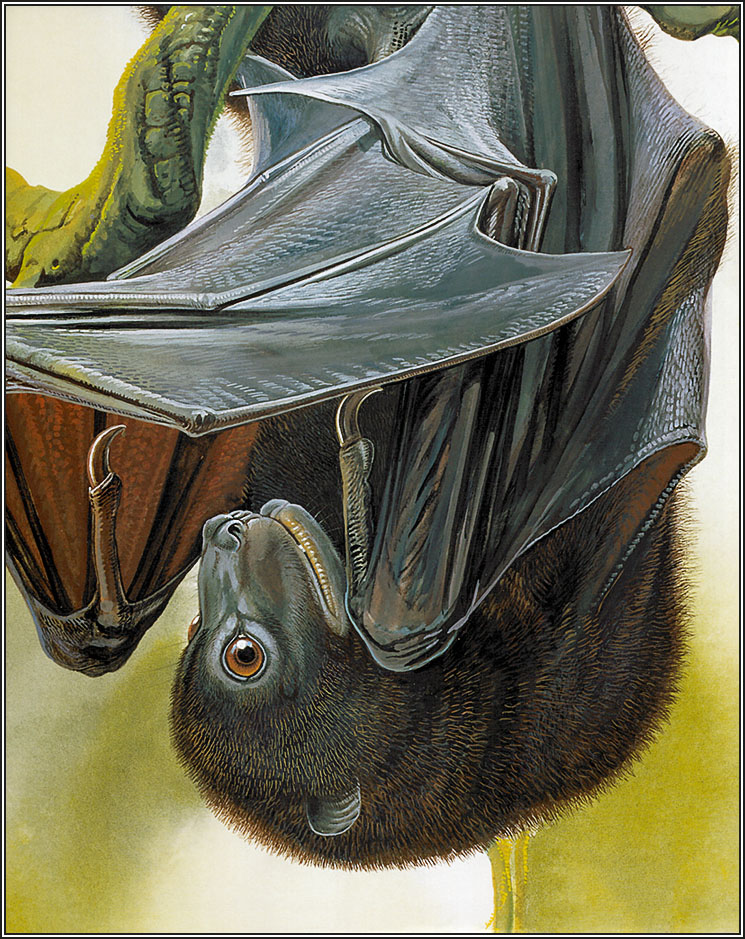
Bougainville monkey-faced bat

Although this oceanic island ecoregion contains only forty-seven mammal species, twenty-six of those species are endemic or near endemic, including nine murid rodents (Melomys, Solomys, Uromys), fifteen pteropodid bats (Dobsonia, Melonycteris, Nyctimene, Pteralopex, Pteropus), one molossid bat (Chaerephon) and the Flower-faced bat (Anthops ornatus). Three of the fruit bats, Bougainville monkey-faced bat (Pteralopex anceps), Guadalcanal monkey-faced bat (Pteralopex atrata) and Montane monkey-faced bat (Pteralopex pulchra), are critically endangered, and three of the rodents are endangered, Buka Island mosaic-tailed rat or Buka Island melomys (Melomys spechti), Poncelet's giant rat or Poncelet's naked-tailed rat (Solomys ponceleti), and emperor rat (Uromys imperator) that is endemic to Guadalcanal.

== The bird species of the Solomon archipelago ==
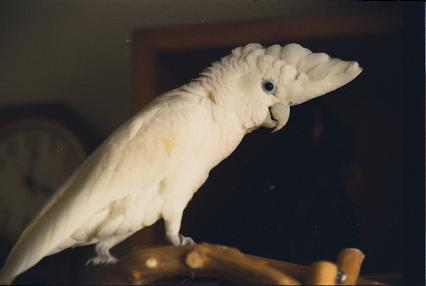
Ducorps' cockatoo

This oceanic island ecoregion has least seven endemic genera of birds. Makira (San Cristobal) and the New Georgia group, have their own endemic species. A total of 199 bird species inhabit the Solomons and of those birds, about 69 bird species are found nowhere else in the world. Two bird species are critically endangered: Makira woodhen (Gallinula silvestris), yellow-legged pigeon (Columba pallidiceps). Four bird species are endangered: imitator goshawk or imitator sparrowhawk (Accipiter imitator), Woodford's rail (Hypotaenidia woodfordi), red-knobbed imperial pigeon (Ducula rubricera), and white-eyed starling (Aplonis brunneicapillus).
