= Temotu flying fox =

Conservation status
- Endangered (IUCN 3.1)

Scientific classification
- Kingdom: Animalia
- Phylum: Chordata
- Class: Mammalia
- Order: Chiroptera
- Family: Pteropodidae
- Genus: Pteropus
- Species: P. nitendiensis

Binomial name
- Pteropus nitendiensis Sanborn, 1930
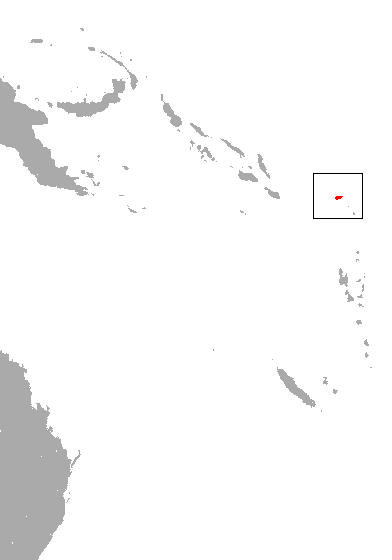
- Temotu flying fox range

Species of bat

The Temotu flying fox (Pteropus nitendiensis) is a species of flying fox in the family Pteropodidae. It is endemic to the Solomon Islands. It is threatened by habitat destruction due to subsistence agricultural practices, as well as natural disasters such as tropical cyclones. Due to its imperiled status, it is identified by the Alliance for Zero Extinction as a species in danger of imminent extinction. In 2013, Bat Conservation International listed this species as one of the 35 species of its worldwide priority list of conservation.

== Taxonomy and systematics ==
The Whitney South Sea Expedition was funded by the American Museum of Natural History to collect new animal specimens from Pacific islands. In 1924, expedition member Frederick P. Drowne collected a specimen of bat on Nitendi Island, also known as Nendö Island, that had yet to be described. American ecologist Colin Campbell Sanborn described the specimen as a new species of bat in a 1930 publication. Its species name nitendiensis refers to the type locality.

In a 2014 paper, the authors determined that the Temotu flying fox was part of the "samoensis " group of flying foxes, and therefore its closest relatives include the following species:

- Vanuatu flying fox (P. anetianus)
- Makira flying fox (P. cognatus)
- Banks flying fox (P. fundatus)
- Rennell flying fox (P. rennelli)
- Samoa flying fox (P. samoensis)
- Vanikoro flying fox (P. tuberculatus)

== Range and habitat ==
The Temotu flying fox is endemic to the Solomon Islands, where it occurs at elevations from 0–220 m (0–722 ft) above sea level. In total, it has been found on the following islands, all within Temotu Province: Temotu Noi, Malo, Nendö Island, and Tinakula. Its range is highly restricted and may only encompass 551 km^{2} (213 mi^{2}).

== Conservation ==
As of 2020, the IUCN lists the Temotu flying fox as an endangered species. It meets the criteria due to its small geographic range, susceptibility to natural disasters, and continual habitat destruction and degradation in the Solomon Islands. Additionally, its population is decreasing and it is a target of the local bushmeat trade. It may be killed to prevent damage to agriculture or to use its teeth in necklace making.
