= Bat Conservation International =

US-based non-governmental organization

- Bat Conservation International Inc.
- Abbreviation: BCI
- Formation: October 2, 1982; 44 years ago
- Founder: Merlin D. Tuttle
- Type: Charitable trust
- Tax ID no.: 74-2553144
- Legal status: 501(c)(3)
- Purpose: Environmentalism, Conservation
- Headquarters: Austin, Texas
- Origins: Milwaukee, Wisconsin
- Region served: Worldwide
- Board Chair: Charles Chester, Ph.D.
- Executive Director: Mike Daulton
- Board of directors: Charles Chester, Ph.D.; Gary Dreyzin; Gerald Carter, Ph.D.; Ann George; Brock Fenton, Ph.D.; Dr. Shahroukh Mistry; Jenn Stephens, MBA; Nancy Simmons, Ph.D.; Andy Sansom, Ph.D.; Maria Mathis-Kruser; George 'Timo' Hixon; Alexander R. (Sandy) Read; Donald R. Kendall, Jr., MBA; Eileen Arbues; Roger Still
- Website: www.batcon.org

Bat Conservation International (BCI) is an international nongovernmental organization working to conserve bats and their habitats through conservation, education, and research efforts.

BCI was founded in 1982 by bat biologist Merlin Tuttle, who led the organization until his retirement in 2009. Since its establishment, BCI has formed partnerships with the U.S. Fish and Wildlife Service and many national and international agencies and nonprofits, and has produced publications, workshops, scholarships, and research, and site-specific projects in the US and internationally. BCI employs a staff of 30 biologists, educators, and administrators and has members in 60 countries.

== Conservation strategies ==
BCI operates by its "10 critical conservation strategies": 1) Accelerating scientific research 2) Preventing extinction 3) Protecting intact areas with highly diverse bat communities 4) Preserving megapopulations of bats 5) Creating global and regional partnerships 6) Addressing threats impacting multiple species at multiple sites 7) Promoting community-based bat conservation 8) Creating and enforcing legal and policy frameworks 9) Developing and perfecting important technology 10) Investing in future conservation leadership

=== Addressing serious threats ===
BCI funds and participates in research to mitigate damage to bat populations. Some of the threats previously or currently addressed include:

- The effects of uranium mines on bats that use them as roosts
- Ways to reduce bat mortality from wind turbines
- Mass mortality from white-nose syndrome
- Guano mining in bat caves

=== Protecting megapopulations ===
Being colonial, many bat species form colonies that can consist of millions of individuals. Because some bat species are highly aggregated, entire species can be threatened by disturbance to a small number of roosts. BCI seeks to protect these roosts of high aggregations, or "mega-populations." Some ways that BCI works to protect megapopulations are:

- Determining the effects of cave gates on bat usage of caves
- Purchasing land with important caves, such as Bracken Cave, home of the world's largest bat colony
- Using education and outreach to protect bat roosts from purposeful eradication, such as the colony at the Congress Avenue Bridge that was initially unwelcome

=== Preventing extinction ===
In their 2014–2018 Strategic Plan, BCI identified 35 critically endangered or endangered species of bats as priority species that will receive a concentrated focus of research and conservation efforts to hopefully prevent their extinction. BCI is also a member of the Alliance for Zero Extinction, which seeks to safeguard the last habitats of critically endangered species.

In 2022, Bat Conservation International (BCI) has employed the use of high accuracy workflow via GIS (Global Information System) to survey abandoned mines in New Mexico. They survey habitats that can support favorable conditions (right moisture and temperature, absence of predators, and other factors); protecting habitats helps the native population of bats to avoid extinction. BCI has a team of 30 employees who manages the preservation of 35 endangered bat species with 3 species endemic to the United States. In conjunction with the Bureau of Land Management (BLM) and other government regional land management organizations, BCI collects data to locate these sites. Moreover, topographical maps provided by the USGS (United States Geological Service) and two Arrow 100 Global Navigation satellites System (GNSS) have been used to navigate terrains and locate entrances or gateways to prospective abandon mines that can be used by the bat populations. Sites are then evaluated by using Survey123 (a data collection application) to analyze and disseminate data (temperature, humidity, guano concentrations that determines concentration of food sources, etc.). 785 mines in the vicinity of Palomas Gap, Timber Mountain, Rincon Basin, Burbank Canyon, and Brushy Mountain have been selected by the BCI team as candidate locations. As reported from the ArcNews Winter 2022 issue, BCI has completed evaluating about 308 sites that yielded 8 habitats with evidence of bat activity.

Common name	Species name	IUCN conservation status	Range
Indiana bat	Myotis sodalis	NT (formerly EN)	Eastern U.S.
Florida bonneted bat	Eumops floridanus	VU (formerly CR)	Southern Florida
Greater long-nosed bat	Leptonycteris nivalis	EN	Southwest U.S., Mexico
Jamaican greater funnel-eared bat	Natalus jamaicensis	CR	Jamaica
Paraguana moustached bat	Pteronotus paraguanensis	EN	Venezuela
Fernandez's sword-nosed bat	Lonchorhina fernandezi	EN	Venezuela
Marinkelle's sword-nosed bat	Lonchorhina marinkellei	VU (formerly EN)	Colombia
Choco broad-nosed bat	Platyrrhinus chocoensis	VU (formerly EN)	Panama, Colombia, Ecuador
Ecuadorian sac-winged bat	Balantiopteryx infusca	VU (formerly EN)	Ecuador, Colombia
Smokey bat	Amorphochilus schnablii	VU (formerly EN)	Ecuador, Chile
Lesser yellow-shouldered bat	Sturnira nana	EN	Peru, Ecuador
Lamotte's roundleaf bat	Hipposideros lamottei	CR	Border of Côte d'Ivoire and Guinea
Maclaud's horseshoe bat	Rhinolophus maclaudi	EN	Guinea
Ziama horseshoe bat	Rhinolophus ziama	EN	Guinea, Liberia
Hill's horseshoe bat	Rhinolophus hilli	CR	Rwanda
Rodrigues flying fox	Pteropus rodricensis	CR	Rodrigues
Seychelles sheath-tailed bat	Coleura seychellensis	CR	Seychelles
Golden-crowned flying fox	Acerodon jubatus	EN	The Philippines
Philippine bare-backed fruit bat	Dobsonia chapmani	CR	The Philippines
Marianas flying fox	Pteropus mariannus	EN	Northern Mariana Islands, Guam
Pacific sheath-tailed bat	Emballonura semicaudata	EN	American Samoa, Fiji, Micronesia, Northern Mariana Islands, Palau, Samoa, Tonga
Bulmer's fruit bat	Aproteles bulmerae	CR	Papua New Guinea
New Guinea big-eared bat	Pharotis imogene	CR	Papua New Guinea
Bougainville monkey-faced bat	Pteralopex anceps	EN	Papua New Guinea, Solomon Islands
Greater monkey-faced bat	Pteralopex flanneryi	CR	Papua New Guinea, Solomon Islands
Guadalcanal monkey-faced bat	Pteralopex atrata	EN	Solomon Islands
Makira flying fox	Pteropus cognatus	EN	Solomon Islands
Montane monkey-faced bat	Pteralopex pulchra	CR	Solomon Islands
New Georgia monkey-faced bat	Pteralopex taki	EN	Solomon Islands
Temotu flying fox	Pteropus nitendiensis	EN	Solomon Islands
Vanikoro flying fox	Pteropus tuberculatus	CR	Solomon Islands
Banks flying fox	Pteropus fundatus	EN	Vanuatu
Fijian monkey-faced bat	Mirimiri acrodonta	CR	Fiji
Fijian mastiff bat	Chaerephon bregullae	EN	Fiji, Vanuatu

=== Political advocacy ===
In addition to promoting scientific research on bats and their conservation, BCI is also involved in public policy. BCI announces opposition to legislation to mobilize its members against it, such as with Pennsylvania House Bill 1576, which would have changed how threatened and endangered species are protected in the state. In the future, BCI plans to increase its engagement in legislative and policy efforts to conserve bats.

== See also ==
- Bats of the United States
- Conservation movement
- List of bat conservation and research groups

External audio
- Adventures With a Bat Biologist, 12:29, To the Best of Our Knowledge
