= List of bat conservation and research groups =

The following are organizations that have been founded to promote the conservation and research of bats.

== International ==
- Bat Conservation International

== Africa ==
- Gauteng & Northern Regions Bat Interest Group
- African Bat Conservation (ABC)
- Bats without Borders

== Asia ==
- Bat Conservation India Trust

== Oceania ==
- Australasian Bat Society (ABS)
- Pacific Bat Conservation Network (PacBat)
- BatsLab

== Europe ==
- Bat Conservation Trust
- Devon Bat Group

== North America ==
- BatBnB
- Bat World Sanctuary
- Center for Bat Research, Outreach, and Conservation
- Central Coast Bat Survey (CCBS)
  - As the primary project of the Pacific Coast Conservation Alliance (PCCA) and under guidance of the NABat, the CCBS works to determine the effects of bats on local agriculture. They believe the presence of bats can significantly reduce the use of pesticides and decrease the annual loss of agricultural revenue. Their studies in local vineyards have found that introduction of bat boxes not only combats the effects of human-initiated habitat degradation/fragmentation but also provides a natural form of pest control. They hope to find further evidence supporting the benefits of bat boxes and the positive impact bats can have on agriculture.
- Lubee Bat Conservancy
- Gotham Bat Conservancy
- Merlin Tuttle's Bat Conservation
- North American Bat Monitoring Program (NABat)
  - NABat strives to "create a continent-wide program to monitor bats at local to rangewide scales that will provide reliable data to promote effective conservation decisionmaking and the long-term viability of bat populations across the continent." With the guidance of several bat biologists, wildlife managers, policymakers, statisticians, data managers, bat field biologists, population geneticists, population modelers, and database experts they have determined four acceptable monitoring practices: winter hibernaculum counts, maternity roost counts, mobile acoustic surveys along road transects, and stationary acoustic surveys. Their comprehensive report regarding the importance of species conservation, has laid the foundation for future bat monitoring projects.
- Organization for Bat Conservation (defunct)
- Western Bat Working Group (WBWG)
  - Like the others, the WBWG strives to reduce natural and unnatural sources for species extinction through education and technical assistance. They have developed a matrix detailing species presence throughout the western North American Continent. The matrix is intended to help focus conservation efforts and provide insight to the effects of population monitoring.

== South America ==
- Programme for the Conservation of Argentinian Bats
