= Banks flying fox =

Conservation status
- Endangered (IUCN 3.1)

Scientific classification
- Kingdom: Animalia
- Phylum: Chordata
- Class: Mammalia
- Order: Chiroptera
- Family: Pteropodidae
- Genus: Pteropus
- Species: P. fundatus

Binomial name
- Pteropus fundatus Felten & Kock, 1972
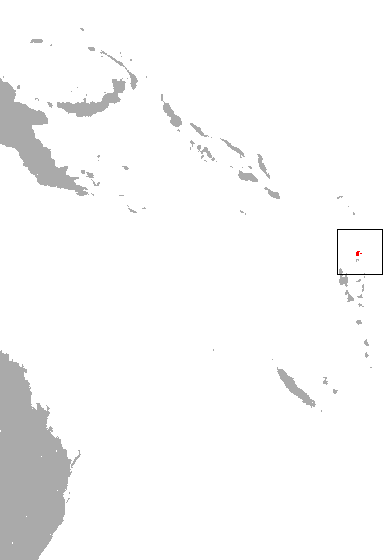
- Banks flying fox range

Species of bat

The Banks flying fox (Pteropus fundatus) is a species of megabat in the family Pteropodidae. It is endemic to Vanuatu. Its natural habitats are subtropical or tropical dry forests and subtropical or tropical swamps. These small fruit bats are about 15 cm. long with grey and brown on its head and back with a yellow-orange neck and yellow-gray bellies. Its diet consists of coconut flowers and Vaveli trees fruit since its home is tropical.

== Taxonomy and etymology ==
It was described as a new species in 1972 by Felten and Kock. Its common name is derived from the name of the islands where it is found, the Banks Islands.

== Description ==
It is a relatively small flying fox, with a forearm length of 100–102 mm (3.9–4.0 in).

== Range and habitat ==
The Banks flying fox is endemic to Vanuatu in Oceania. It is only found on the islands of Mota and Vanua Lava. It is found in lowland areas.

== Conservation ==
As of 2008, it is listed as an endangered species by the IUCN. Due to its imperiled status, it is identified by the Alliance for Zero Extinction as a species in danger of imminent extinction. In 2013, Bat Conservation International listed this species as one of the 35 species of its worldwide priority list of conservation. In 2016, Ripple et al. published an analysis that concluded that the Banks flying fox is one of the 301 species of mammal most susceptible to extinction via overhunting.
