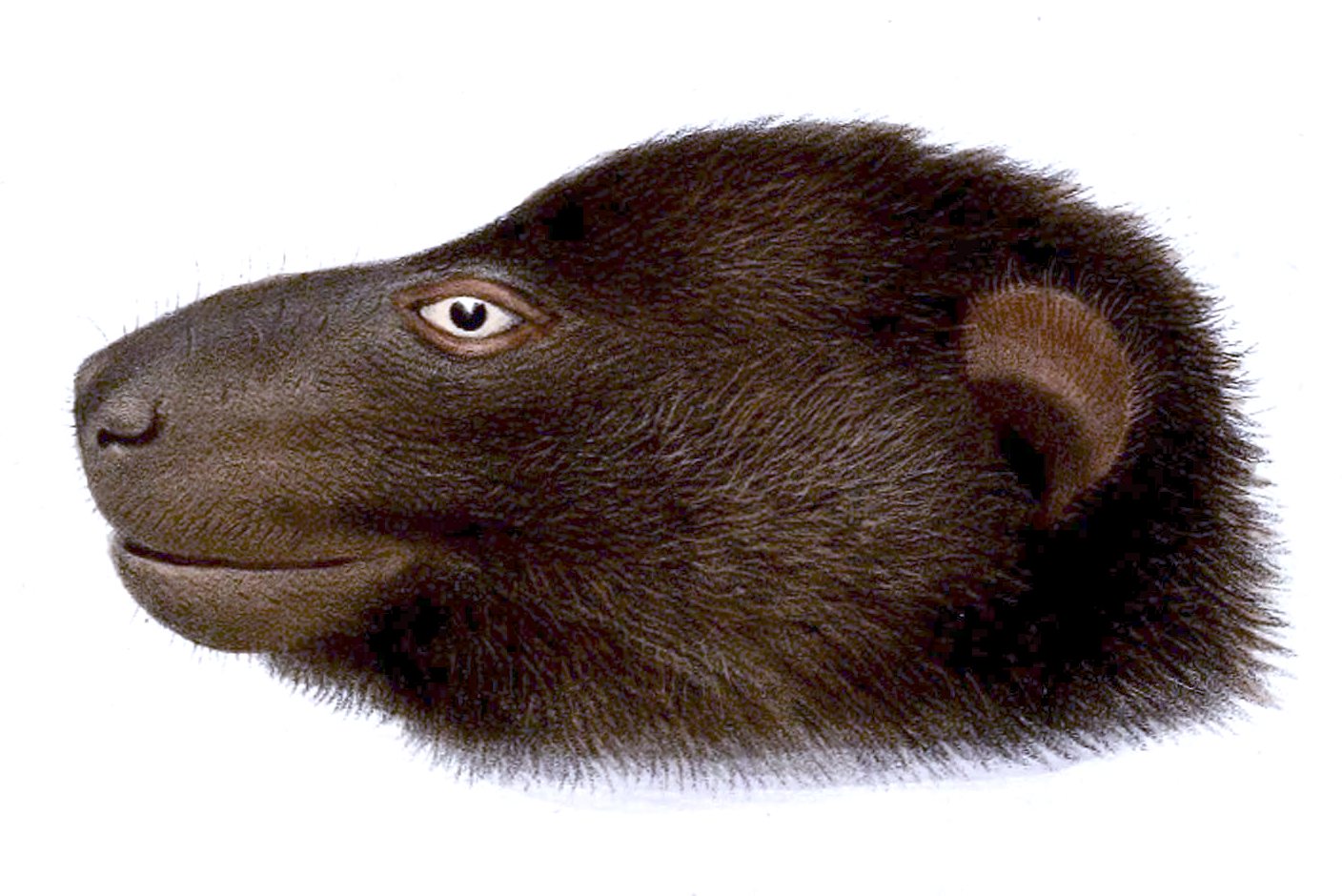
- Guadalcanal monkey-faced bat (Pteralopex atrata)

Scientific classification
- Kingdom: Animalia
- Phylum: Chordata
- Class: Mammalia
- Order: Chiroptera
- Family: Pteropodidae
- Subfamily: Pteropodinae
- Genus: Pteralopex; Thomas, 1888

Type species
- Pteralopex atrata Thomas, 1888

Species
- See text

= Pteralopex =

Genus of bats

Pteralopex is a genus of large megabats in the family Pteropodidae. Species in this genus are commonly known as "monkey-faced bats". They are restricted to Solomon Islands rain forests in Melanesia, and all species are seriously threatened, being rated as either endangered or critically endangered by IUCN. Two species, P. taki and P. flanneryi, have been described since 2000.

== Species ==
This genus includes five identified species:

- Bougainville monkey-faced bat, Pteralopex anceps
- Guadalcanal monkey-faced bat, Pteralopex atrata
- Greater monkey-faced bat, Pteralopex flanneryi
- Montane monkey-faced bat, Pteralopex pulchra
- New Georgian monkey-faced bat, Pteralopex taki

The Fijian monkey-faced bat, formerly placed in this genus, has recently been transferred to the monotypic Mirimiri.
