= Fijian mastiff bat =

Fijian free-tailed bat

Conservation status
- Endangered (IUCN 3.1)

Scientific classification
- Kingdom: Animalia
- Phylum: Chordata
- Class: Mammalia
- Order: Chiroptera
- Family: Molossidae
- Genus: Mops
- Species: M. bregullae

Binomial name
- Mops bregullae (Felten, 1964)
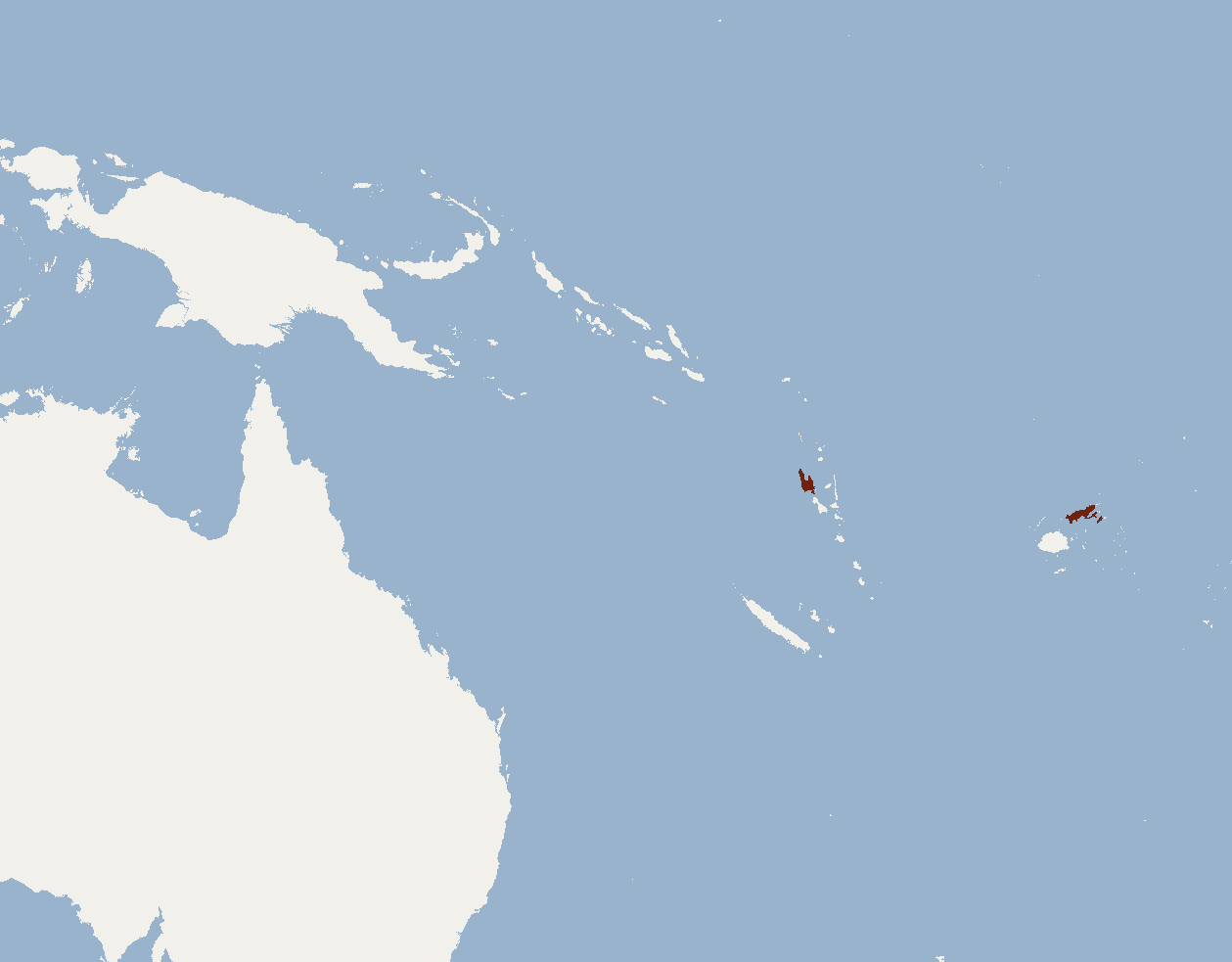

Species of bat found in Fiji and Vanuatu

The Fijian mastiff bat (Mops bregullae), also known as the Fijian free-tailed bat, is a species of bat in the family Molossidae. It is found in Fiji and Vanuatu. In 2013, Bat Conservation International listed this species as one of the 35 species of its worldwide priority list of conservation. This species is currently listed as endangered and considered a species of special concern due to habitat fragmentation and cave disturbance. The Fijian free-tailed bat is endemic to Fiji and Vanuatu. This species was previously documented on the islands of Taveuni and Vanua Levu, current research indicates possible small fragmented populations inhabiting both islands. Only two insectivorous bats occupy Fiji, the Pacific sheath-tailed bat and the Fijian free-tailed bat. Both species consume night flying insects, foraging high above the canopy.

== Population ==
Estimated populations of Fijian free-tailed bats are approximately 7,000 individuals globally. Cave disturbance, over harvesting, and deforestation are contributing to population decline throughout the species range.

== Habitat ==
The habitat range and ecology of this species is unknown. Previously, the Fijian free-tailed bat was observed in caves located on Vanuatu. The foraging behavior of this species has been observed in coconut groves, farmland, forest and coastal regions of Fiji.

== Conservation ==
The Fijian free-tailed bat is evaluated as endangered by the IUCN, a species at risk of becoming extinct. The first Fijian bat sanctuary was established in 2018, The National Trust of Fiji acquired Nakanacagi Cave. The Fijian free-tailed bat is considered extirpated from Tonga due to disturbance and overharvesting.
