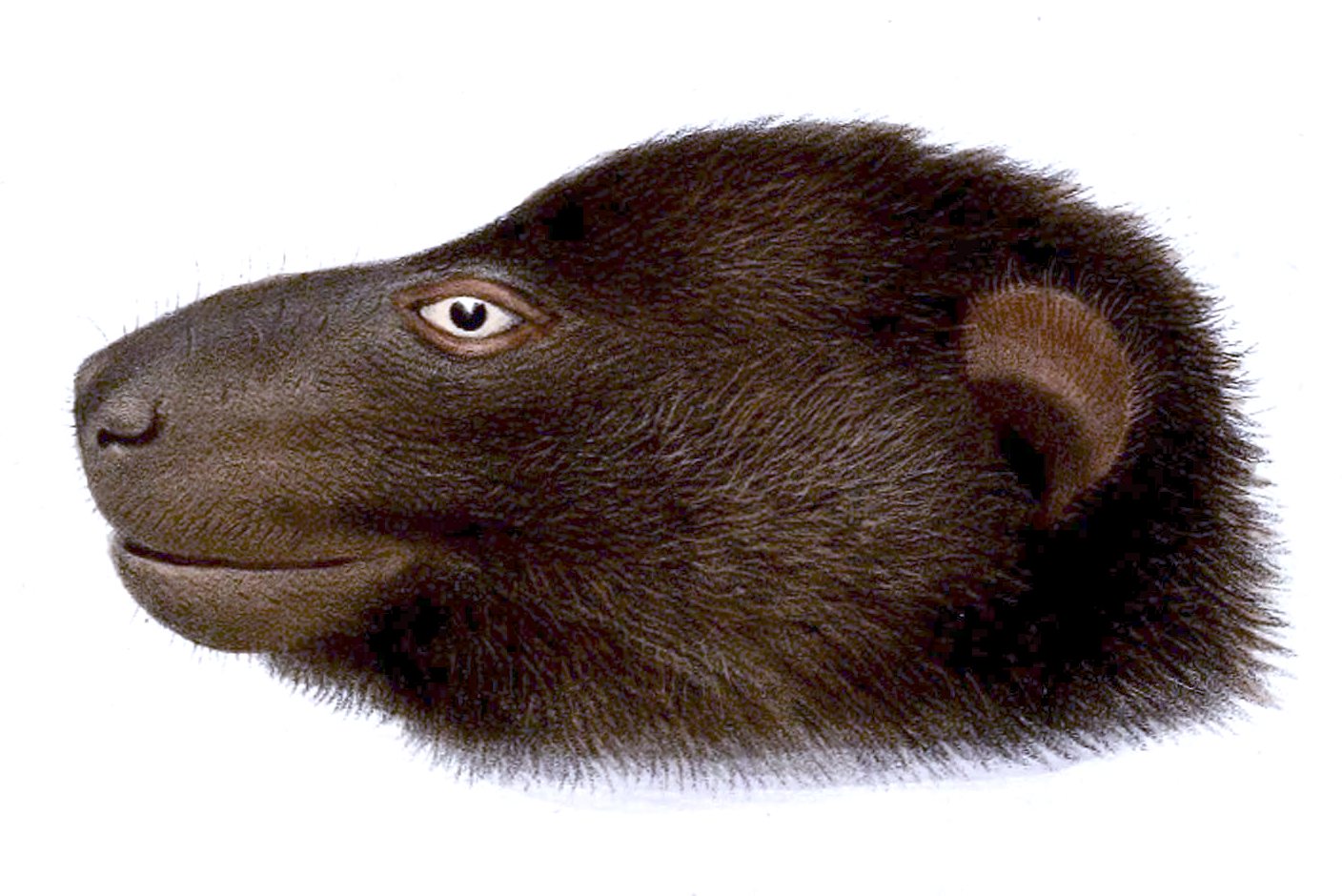

Conservation status
- Endangered (IUCN 3.1)

Scientific classification
- Kingdom: Animalia
- Phylum: Chordata
- Class: Mammalia
- Order: Chiroptera
- Family: Pteropodidae
- Genus: Pteralopex
- Species: P. atrata

Binomial name
- Pteralopex atrata (Thomas, 1888)
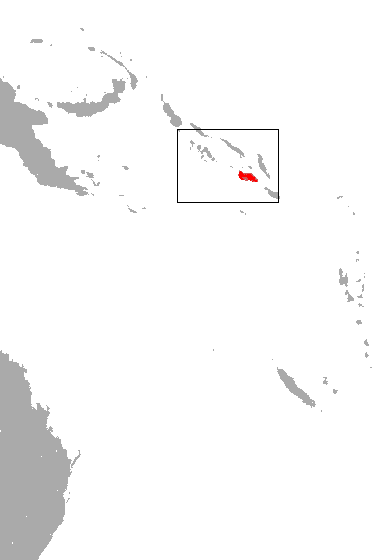
- Guadalcanal monkey-faced bat range

= Guadalcanal monkey-faced bat =

Species of mammal

The Guadalcanal monkey-faced bat or Guadalcanal flying monkey (Pteralopex atrata) is a megabat endemic to Solomon Islands. It is listed as an endangered species. In 2013, Bat Conservation International listed this species as one of the 35 species of its worldwide priority list of conservation.

== Taxonomy and etymology ==
It was the first species of its genus, the monkey-faced bats, to be described. It was described by British zoologist Oldfield Thomas in 1888, based on a specimen that had been collected by British naturalist Charles Morris Woodford. Woodford collected the holotype in Aola Bay of Guadalcanal Island, which is a part of the Solomon Islands. While they were both initially described as distinct species, the Guadalcanal monkey-faced bat was considered synonymous with the Bougainville monkey-faced bat from 1954–1978. At present, they are again both considered full species. Its species name atrata is derived from the Latin word atratus, meaning "clothed in black". In his initial description of the species, Thomas noted that its fur was almost uniformly black.

== Description ==
It weighs 438–506 g (0.966–1.116 lb). It has thick and fluffy fur that almost entirely conceals their ears. Ears are small, round, and sparsely furred. Ears are 19.5 mm (0.77 in) long and 17 mm (0.67 in) wide. Like all members of its genus, its iris is red. Its color is mostly black, though its wings are occasionally mottled white., Individual hairs on its back are 12–14 mm (0.47–0.55 in) long. Its wings attach at the spine, unlike many species of bats where wing attachment is more lateral. It has very large upper incisors and thick upper canines. Uniquely, its upper canine is double-cusped. It lacks a tail. Its forearm is approximately 143 mm (5.6 in). Its hind foot is 43 mm (1.7 in) long, and its calcar is 18.5 mm (0.73 in) long. From nose to tail, it is 240 mm (9.4 in). It has an unusually high sagittal crest. Its dental formula is 2.1.3.22.1.3.3, for a total of 34 teeth.

== Biology ==
It is infrequently encountered, and thus little is known about its biology. It was once observed eating unripe mangos. During the day, it likely roosts in hollow trees. It is a known host of bat flies, which are ectoparasites. Specifically, the bat fly species Cyclopodia macracantha macracantha has been found on the Guadalcanal monkey-faced bat.

== Range and habitat ==
It was initially discovered on Guadalcanal Island, and has also been reported on New Georgia Island. It was once reported on Santa Isabel Island in 1931, but this was actually a greater monkey-faced bat that had been misidentified. It has been documented from 0–400 m (0–1,312 ft) above sea level, but it likely occurs up to elevations of 1,000 m (3,300 ft). Most individuals, however, have been collected at or near sea level. It prefers lowland forests. It is probably dependent upon old-growth forests for habitat.

== Conservation ==
It is currently evaluated as endangered by the IUCN. It is threatened by hunting for bushmeat. Logging is also a threat to this species, as it likely roosts in hollow trees during the day. It has consistently been evaluated as endangered since it was first assessed in 1994, with the exception of 1996–2008 when it was evaluated as critically endangered. The only record of its occurrence on New Georgia Island is a single skull discovered in 1975. Despite extensive surveys, no Guadalcanal monkey-faced bats have been encountered on New Georgia Island since then, and it is feared extirpated from the island. It was last observed on Guadalcanal Island in September 2015.
