= Volunteer Service Abroad =

New Zealand–based volunteering agency

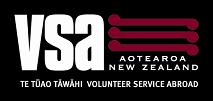
- Founded: 1962
- Type: Non-governmental organization
- Purpose: Development
- Location: 77 Thorndon Quay, Wellington, New Zealand
- Region served: Melanesia, Polynesia, Timor-Leste
- Key people: Kirikaiahi Mahutariki - Kaitakawaenga; Simon Mark - Council President; Hone McGregor - Council Chair; Stephen Goodman - CEO
- Website: www.vsa.org.nz
- Member of Council for International Development

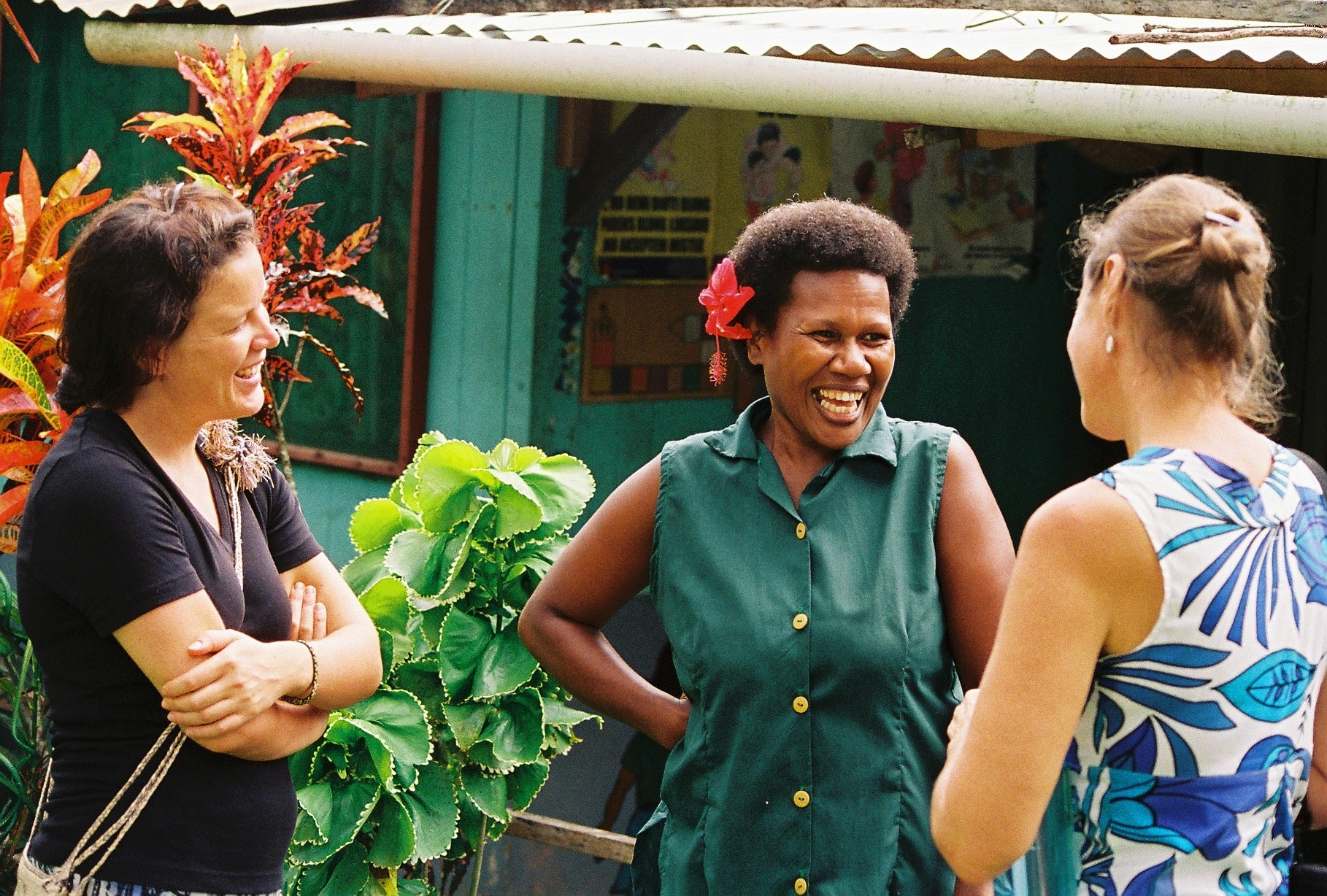
VSA volunteers at work in Vanuatu

Volunteer Service Abroad - Te Tūao Tāwāhi (VSA) a New Zealand-based volunteering agency working in international development.

== Operations ==
VSA volunteers share skills with people in the wider Pacific. VSA's work is diverse and driven by the development needs of in-country partners. These partner organisations range from regional and central government agencies to local or national NGOs, education and health bodies and individual schools, colleges and health clinics. VSA is a registered charity and is non-religious, non-political and non-governmental.

VSA has 85-100 volunteers in the field at any one time. Since 1962 VSA has recruited around 4000 ordinary New Zealanders from a wide range of backgrounds, from business mentors and lawyers to IT advisers and eco-tourism operators.

All VSA assignments fit within one or more of six focus areas: building local business, supporting strong communities, safeguarding the environment, fostering good governance, education and health. In addition to these, VSA considers issues related to gender equity, human rights and young people as central to all our work.

VSA is currently working in the Cook Islands, Kiribati, Papua New Guinea (including the Autonomous Region of Bougainville), the Solomon Islands, Samoa, Tokelau, Tonga and Vanuatu in the Pacific and in Timor-Leste in Asia. VSA volunteer assignments in countries other than these "core programmes" are arranged through the New Zealand and Regional Partnerships Programme (see below).

== History ==
VSA began by sending New Zealand volunteers to Thailand and Samoa in 1962. In February 1963, Sir Edmund Hillary became VSA's founding President, a role he continued in for 13 years. In the 1960s, most VSA volunteers taught in schools. Today the range of assignments is broader. VSA's project partners, once mostly host governments, now include a range of government agencies, non-governmental organisations and community organisations.

VSA's programmes are managed from a Wellington office, but in-country VSA programme managers and administrators in each region provide on-the-ground support to volunteers and partner organisations.

On 26 May, it was reported that the VSA had been the subject of a cyber attack that locked the charity out of its computer systems and servers. However, the hackers failed to obtain information since the data was encrypted and the servers mainly held historical information. A criminal group demanded a ransom in return. In response, the volunteer agency’s chief executive Stephen Goodman refused to pay the ransom and engaged a New Zealand cyber security organisation, Cert NZ, the Privacy Commissioner, and the New Zealand Police.
