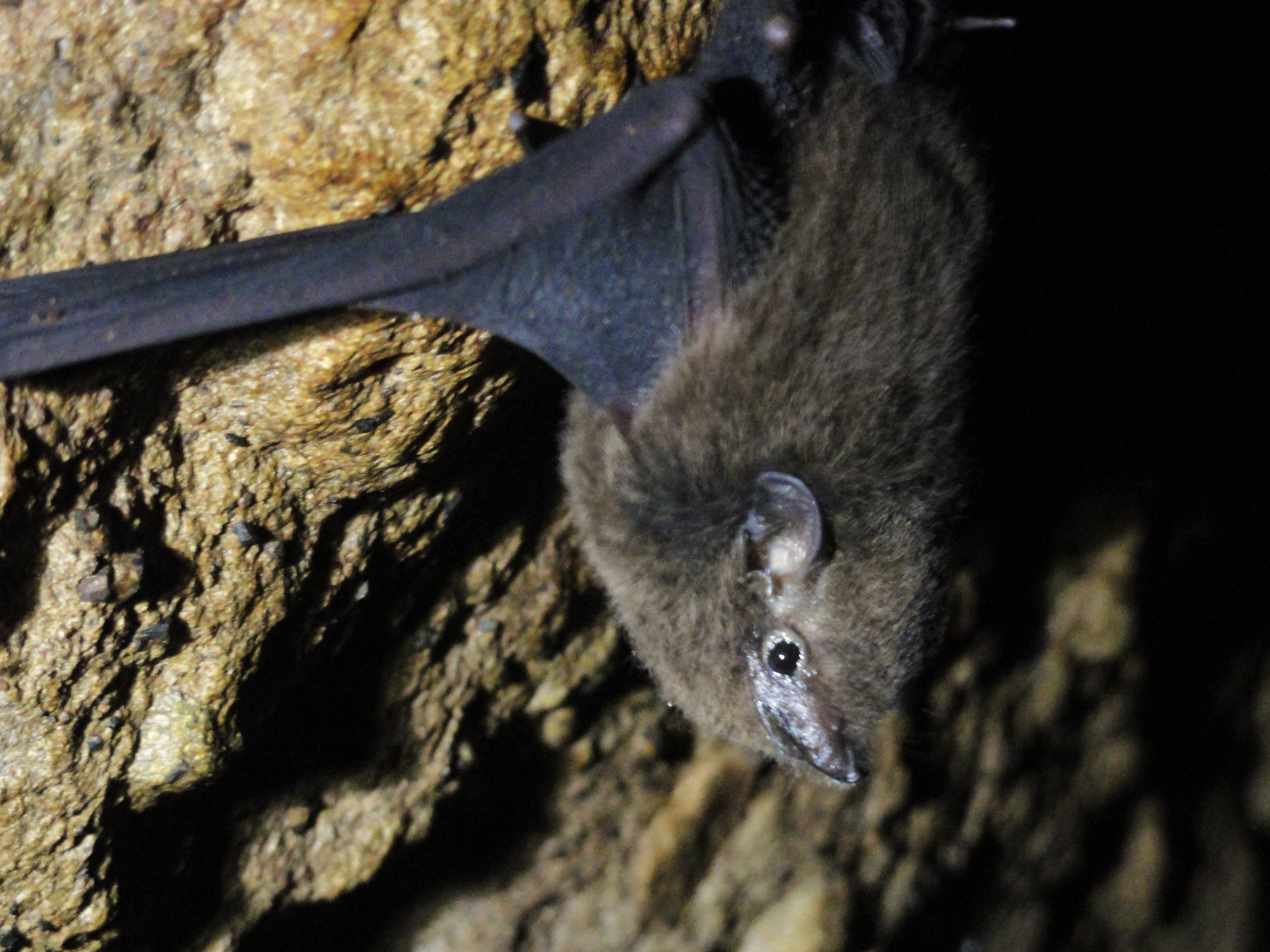

Conservation status
- Endangered (IUCN 3.1)

Scientific classification
- Kingdom: Animalia
- Phylum: Chordata
- Class: Mammalia
- Order: Chiroptera
- Family: Emballonuridae
- Genus: Emballonura
- Species: E. semicaudata

Binomial name
- Emballonura semicaudata (Peale, 1848)
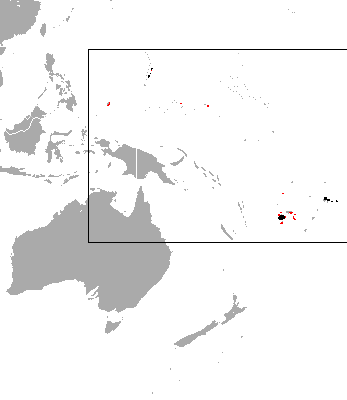
- Pacific sheath-tailed bat range (red — extant, black — extinct)

Synonyms
- Vespertilio semicaudatus Peale, 1848

= Pacific sheath-tailed bat =

Species of bat

The Pacific sheath-tailed bat or Polynesian sheath-tailed bat (Emballonura semicaudata) is a species of sac-winged bat in the family Emballonuridae found in American Samoa, Fiji, Guam, Micronesia, Palau, Samoa (where it is called pe'a vai, tagiti or pe'ape'a vai), Tonga, and Vanuatu. Its natural habitat is caves.

== Taxonomy ==
The Pacific sheath-tailed bat was initially described as a species in 1848 by American naturalist Titian Peale. He placed it in the genus Vespertilio with a scientific name of Vespertilio semicaudatus. There are four subspecies:

- E. s. palauensis: found in Palau
- E. s. rotensis: found in the southern Mariana Islands
- E. s. semicaudata: found on Vanuatu, Fiji, Tonga, Samoa, and American Samoa
- E. s. sulcata: found on the islands comprising Chuuk State and Pohnpei

== Biology ==
The Pacific sheath-tailed bat is insectivorous, and prefers to forage in forests. It will travel distances of 5 km (3.1 mi) to reach foraging grounds. At night it roost in caves, lava tubes, tree hollows, and rock crevices. It is a social species, forming colonies ranging in size from a few individuals to hundreds.

== Conservation ==
In 2013, Bat Conservation International listed this species as one of the 35 species on its worldwide priority list for conservation. It is threatened by habitat loss. There are estimated to be approximately 500 individuals of the subspecies E. s. rotensis. Currently known to roost in only three caves, E. s. rotensis is vulnerable to changes in the local habitat, including indirect impacts caused by invasive species such as goats which limit its carrying capacity.
