= Alliance for Zero Extinction =

Collective of nature conservation organizations

Formed in 2000 and launched globally in 2005, the Alliance for Zero Extinction (AZE) comprises 100 non-governmental biodiversity conservation organizations working to prevent species extinctions by identifying and safeguarding sites where species evaluated to be Endangered or Critically Endangered under International Union for Conservation of Nature (IUCN) criteria only exist at one location on Earth. AZE members work to rebuild populations of endangered and critically endangered species through efforts to eliminate human threats such as commercial exploitation, disease and the introduction of invasive species. AZE provides expertise on biodiversity goals for the Convention on Biological Diversity (CBD) and assists party nations in integrating protection of AZE sites and species into National Biodiversity Strategies and Action Plans (NBSAP). Country-based initiatives, or national Alliances for Zero Extinction, have begun to take shape recently representing partnerships of government agencies and non-government organizations to accelerate the protection of AZE sites in compliance with national commitments under the CBD.

== See also ==
- Conservation movement
- Protected area
