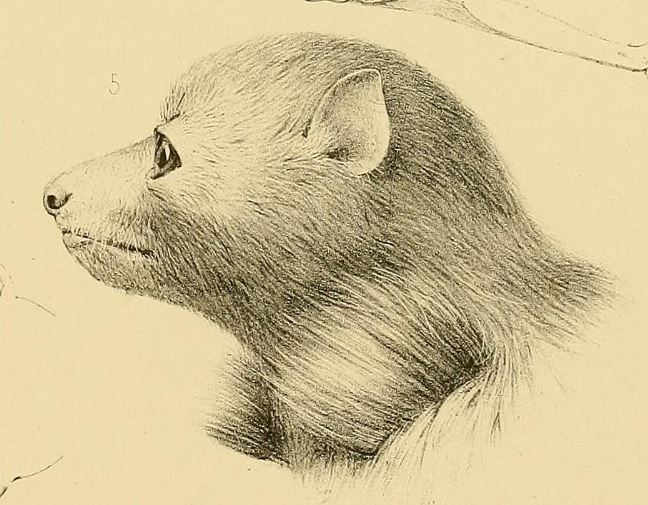

Conservation status
- Endangered (IUCN 3.1)
- CITES Appendix I

Scientific classification
- Kingdom: Animalia
- Phylum: Chordata
- Class: Mammalia
- Order: Chiroptera
- Family: Pteropodidae
- Genus: Pteropus
- Species: P. molossinus

Binomial name
- Pteropus molossinus Temminck, 1853
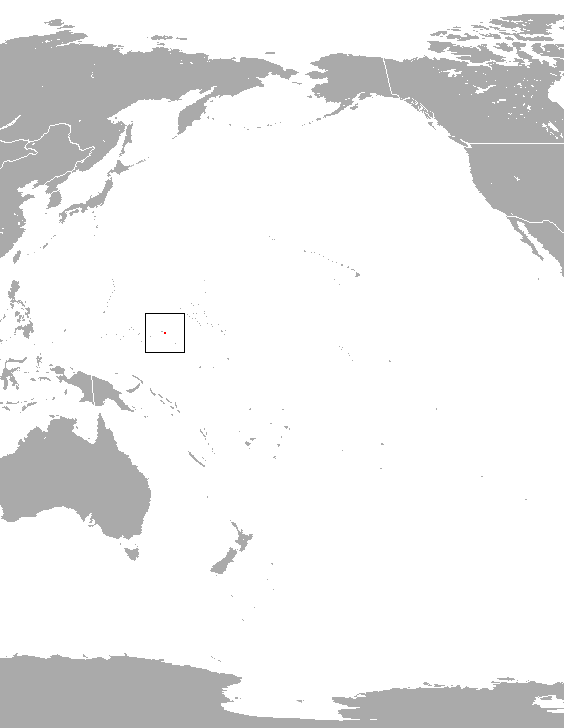
- Caroline flying fox range

Synonyms
- Pteropus breviceps

= Caroline flying fox =

Species of bat

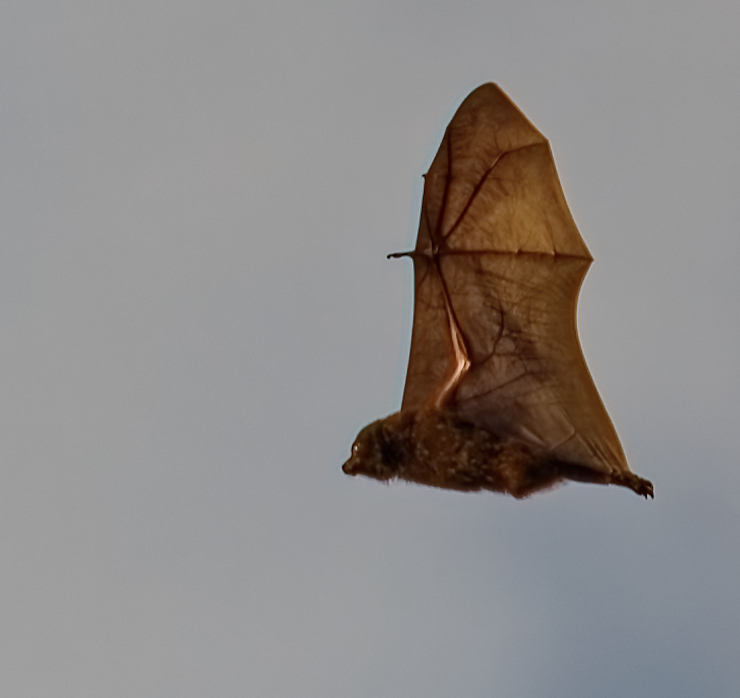
Caroline flying fox in flight.

The Caroline flying fox or Pohnpei flying fox (Pteropus molossinus) is a species of megabat in the genus Pteropus, endemic to Micronesia. Its natural habitat is subtropical or tropical dry forests. Prior to a ban on commercial exploitation, it was hunted for export, substantially impacting its abundance. It is threatened by habitat loss due to expanding plantations.

The Caroline flying-fox is native to the Caroline Islands. It has been recorded only from Pohnpei, Ant Atoll, and Pakin Atoll, all of which are part of the Federated States of Micronesia, where it depends on the tropical forests and fruiting plants. The Caroline flying fox is threatened by habitat loss, hunting pressures, and the small size of its remaining population. As of 2020, it is considered an endangered species by the International Union for Conservation of Nature.

== Taxonomy ==
The Caroline flying fox was described as a new species in 1853 by Dutch zoologist Coenraad Jacob Temminck.

A 2014 phylogenetic analysis determined that the Caroline flying fox was in a clade with the following species:

- Big-eared flying fox, P. macrotis
- Dwarf flying fox, P. woodfordi
- Lesser flying fox, P. mahaganus
- Gilliard's flying fox, P. gilliardorum
- P. pelagicus
- Guam flying fox, P. tokudae †

== Description ==
It is the smallest member of the flying fox genus, with the average adult weighing just over 100 g (3.5 oz). Its forearm length ranges from 90.2–100.0 mm (3.55–3.94 in). Its overall fur color is brown, though the back and rump have a reddish tint.

== Biology ==
Unlike some other flying fox species, it is not typically very social. Individuals usually roost singly or in pairs, though colonies as large as 300 individuals have been documented. It is frugivorous, consuming fruits from palm trees in the genus Clinostigma as well as plants in the genus Pandanus. It also eat flowers, including those from the kapok tree and the coconut tree.
