= New Ireland masked flying fox =

Conservation status
- Vulnerable (IUCN 3.1)

Scientific classification
- Kingdom: Animalia
- Phylum: Chordata
- Class: Mammalia
- Order: Chiroptera
- Family: Pteropodidae
- Genus: Pteropus
- Species: P. ennisae

Binomial name
- Pteropus ennisae Flannery & White, 1991

Species of bat

The New Ireland masked flying fox (Pteropus ennisae) is a species of megabat that is endemic to Papua New Guinea.

== Taxonomy and etymology ==
The New Ireland masked flying fox was initially described in 1991 by Tim Flannery and J. P. White, who regarded it as a subspecies of Temminck's flying fox (Pteropus temminckii ennisae). The holotype had been collected by Flannery, Lester Seri, T. Heinsohn, and Patricia Ennis on the island of New Ireland in 1988. In a 1995 publication, Flannery considered it instead as a subspecies of the Bismarck masked flying fox (Pteropus capistratus ennisae). However, a 2014 study found that the genetic distance between P. capistratus and P. c. ennisae (4.7%), along with several physical differences, was enough to warrant elevating P. ennisae to species level. The eponym for the species name ennisae is Patricia "Tish" Ennis.

== Description ==
Individuals have a mass of 170–250 g (6.0–8.8 oz), a head and body length of 155–185 mm (6.1–7.3 in) and a forearm length of 109.0–118.5 mm (4.29–4.67 in). It can be differentiated from the Bismarck masked flying fox by its indistinct facial markings, darker claws, and darker flight membranes. The top of its head lacks the yellowish tint seen in the Bismarck masked flying fox.

== Range and habitat ==
The New Ireland masked flying fox is endemic to the island of New Ireland in Papua New Guinea. It is found in forested habitat from sea level to 1,200 m (3,900 ft) above sea level.

== Conservation ==
As of 2022, it is considered a vulnerable species by the IUCN. Its population is thought to number between 9,000 and 10,000 mature individuals with a declining trend. It is an uncommon species, occurring in a low density throughout its range. There is extensive and ongoing deforestation on Papua New Guinea that is causing habitat loss.
