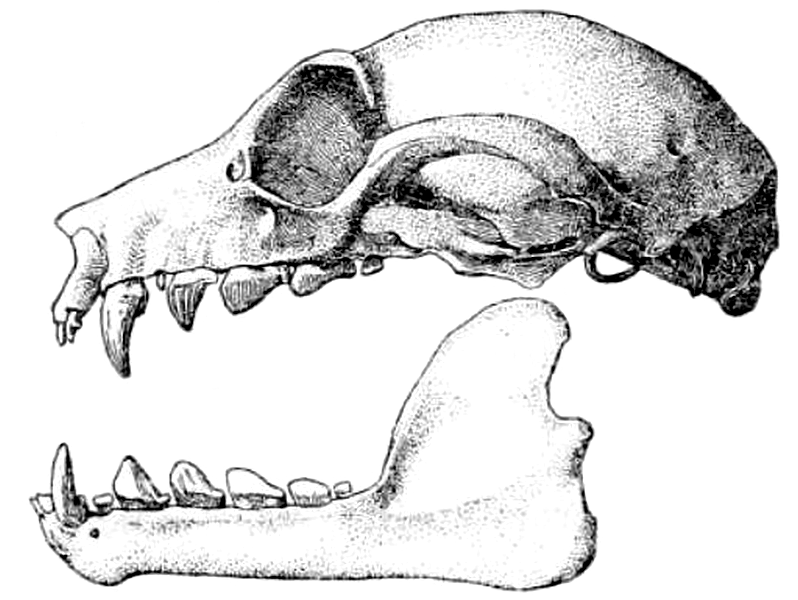

Conservation status
- Data Deficient (IUCN 3.1)

Scientific classification
- Kingdom: Animalia
- Phylum: Chordata
- Class: Mammalia
- Order: Chiroptera
- Family: Pteropodidae
- Genus: Pteropus
- Species: P. lombocensis

Binomial name
- Pteropus lombocensis Dobson, 1878
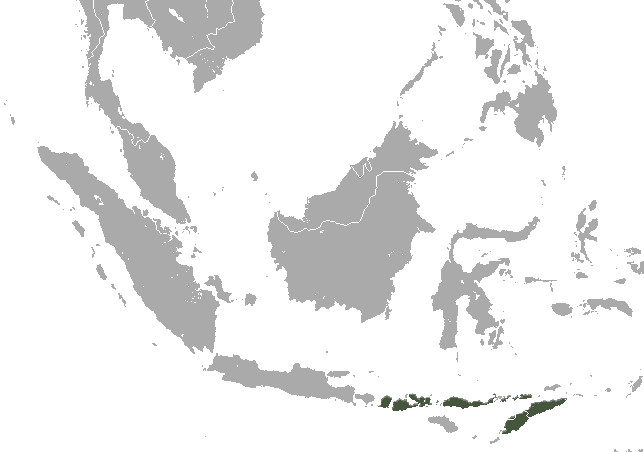
- Lombok flying fox range

= Lombok flying fox =

Species of bat

The Lombok flying fox (Pteropus lombocensis) is a species of megabat in the genus Pteropus. It found in Indonesia and Timor-Leste. This species has been listed on Appendix II of CITES since 1990, along with most others in the genus Pteropus.

== Taxonomy ==
It was first described as a species by Dobson in 1878, though it had been initially published by Gray in his 1870 Catalogue of Monkeys, Lemurs, and Fruit-eating Bats as possibly a variant of Acerodon mackloti.

There are three subspecies, Pteropus lombocensis lombocensis found on the islands of Lombok and Sumbawa, P. l. heudei, found on Flores, Lembata, Pantar, and Alor, and P. l. salottii, found in Soe in West Timor.

A genetic analysis found that it represented a fairly distant lineage from the rest of the genus Pteropus, and placed it within its own group in the genus.

== Description ==
=== Distinguishing features ===
Rostrum very short and stout. First and second molars (M1, M2) and first incisor much reduced. Ears moderate, exposed. Fur rather short, adpressed; tibia clothed above (though not very densely so). Back brownish, underparts paler, mantle ochraceous. Forearm 113–122 mm.

=== Head ===
Deflection of brain-case moderate, alveolar line ill projected backward passing through upper part of occipital condyle. Sagittal crest, if developed, very low; even in adults the temporal crests, though closely approximated, are sometimes not quite united together to form a sagittal crest. Rostrum unusually short and heavy; front of orbit vertically above posterior half of p^{4}. Postorbital processes long and slender, sometimes almost reaching, or even completely fused with, corresponding processes of zygomatic arch. Coronoid height of mandible subequal to (a little smaller or larger than) length of lower tooth-row, c—m_{3}.

Ears not reaching hinder corner of eye, when laid forward. Inner margin evenly convex from base to tip; outer margin flatly convex in upper half, flatly concave in upper half of narrowed off. Naked behind, except at base.

=== Teeth ===
Cingulum of upper canines forming a well-defined, narrow ledge, if examinatory, though slightly less so than in the allied species; generally a terete spicule, in some specimens with crown very slightly differentiated from shaft. Posterior ledge of p^{4} and posterior cusp, if present, indistinctly separating the ledge from the outer main cusp; in p^{1} the ledge is practically confined to the posterior-internal portion of the tooth, whence therefore extends much further backward than the postero-external corner; owing to this, the line of the posterior margin of p^{1} is projected inward would pass through the middle, or the posterior half, in some specimens even through the posterior point of m^{1}; the opposite side, m^{1} almost twice as long as broad. m^{2} much reduced in size, subequal to i._{1}, smaller than usual, one-fourth to one-sixth the bulk of i._{1}. Cingulum of lower canines forming a well-defined, narrow ledge, rather more sharply defined than in upper distinctly though p_{3} large, more and a half, sometimes almost twice the size of i._{1}; but, shatter more on p_{4} and p^{4} short, in p_{4} rather distinctly though not sharply backed off from tooth, in p^{4} ill-defined. m_{1} reduced, much smaller than p_{4}, subequal to m^{2} and i._{1}.

=== Wings, fur color ===
Wing membranes rather thick and evidently developed in centre.

The fur is rather short and adpressed on back, spreading or a little waved on rump. Approximate length of hairs at middle of back 12–14, middle of mantle 13–15, middle of belly 12–14 mm. Fur of upperside extending laterally on the membranes for a short distance beyond their line of origin from the back, the least width of the furred area of the back being 43–45 mm.

Above, humerus thinly covered with short adpressed hairs for proximal half; distal half practically naked. Forearm naked, except for a narrow line of short, very thinly spread, adpressed hairs on outer side along membrane, commencing about 15 mm. above elbow and extending forward for about 20–25 mm. The whole of the femur, and tibia along outer and inner side almost to ankle, densely haired; median line of upperside of tibia clothed with shorter and more thinly spread hairs, the naked skin often showing through.—A tuft of rather stiff glandular hairs on either side of neck.

Beneath, antebrachial membrane extending laterally, lateral membrane along outer side of forearm and between humerus and femur, covered with rather dense woolly hairs. Humerus clothed, the hairs becoming shorter and sparser distally. Forearm almost naked. Femur furred. Tibia naked.

In color, the back is vandyke-brown, in some specimens with a distinct wash of russet; concealed base of fur darker vandyke-brown, sometimes approaching seal-brown; tips of hairs paler, sometimes tinged with buffy. Rump similar to back, or slightly darker, chiefly owing to the more concentrated fur rather than back. Forepart of mantle ochraceous or sienna, approaching raw umber or tawny olive; colour generally distinctly paler, washed with ochraceous-buff or fawny-buff; along entire breast generally slightly darker, owing to the darker base of the fur partly showing through.—Central part of mantle ochraceous, in some individuals tinged with tawny, in others more approaching ochraceous-buff; posteriorly, on shoulders, and laterally, on sides of neck, the colour lightens to more typical ochraceous-buff, sometimes with a distinct wash of russet. Concealed base of fur of mantle and sides of neck seal-brown. Glandular tufts on sides of neck orange-ochraceous, slightly contrasting with surrounding fur, owing to concealed position of tufts.—Occiput, crown, interocular space, and sides of head similar to central portion of mantle or somewhat darker, tawny, tawny ochraceous, or ochraceous, sometimes mixed ochraceous-buff and dark brown; concealed base of hairs vandyke-brown or seal-brown. Chin and throat similar to sides of head.

== Distribution, ecology, and conservation status ==
The Lombok flying fox is found on the islands of south-eastern Indonesia, (on Lombok, Sumbawa, Flores, Lembata, Pantar, Alor, and Timor), and in Timor-Leste. It has been found at elevations up to 500 metres (1,600 ft).

Little is known about the Lombok fly fox's typical habitat, behavior, and population. It probably prefers lowland tropical forest, and has also been found in mango plantations. They are known to eat pollen. It was classified as "Least Concern" by the IUCN in 1996, but was changed to "Data Deficient" in 2008 due to uncertainty of the abundance and possible threats from hunting and habitat destruction.
