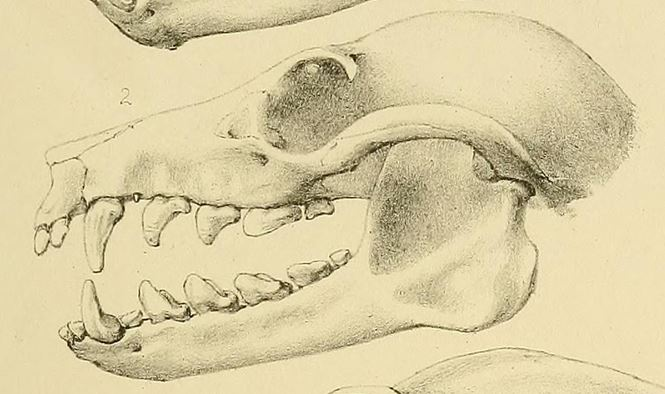

Conservation status
- Near Threatened (IUCN 3.1)

Scientific classification
- Kingdom: Animalia
- Phylum: Chordata
- Class: Mammalia
- Order: Chiroptera
- Family: Pteropodidae
- Genus: Pteropus
- Species: P. vetulus

Binomial name
- Pteropus vetulus Jouan, 1863
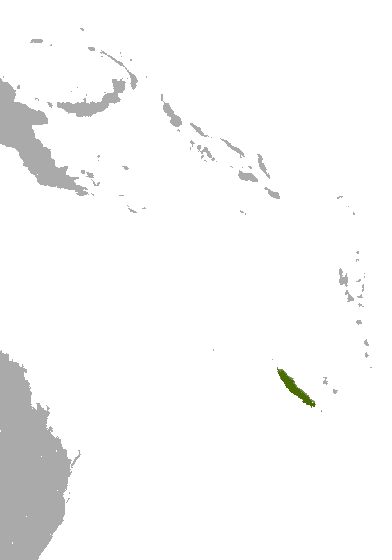
- New Caledonia flying fox range

= New Caledonia flying fox =

Species of bat

The New Caledonia flying fox (Pteropus vetulus) is a species of flying fox in the family Pteropodidae. It is endemic to New Caledonia. The habitat of the species is highly fragmented, and possibly decreasing due to deforestation. Other threats such as hunting are as yet unquantified.

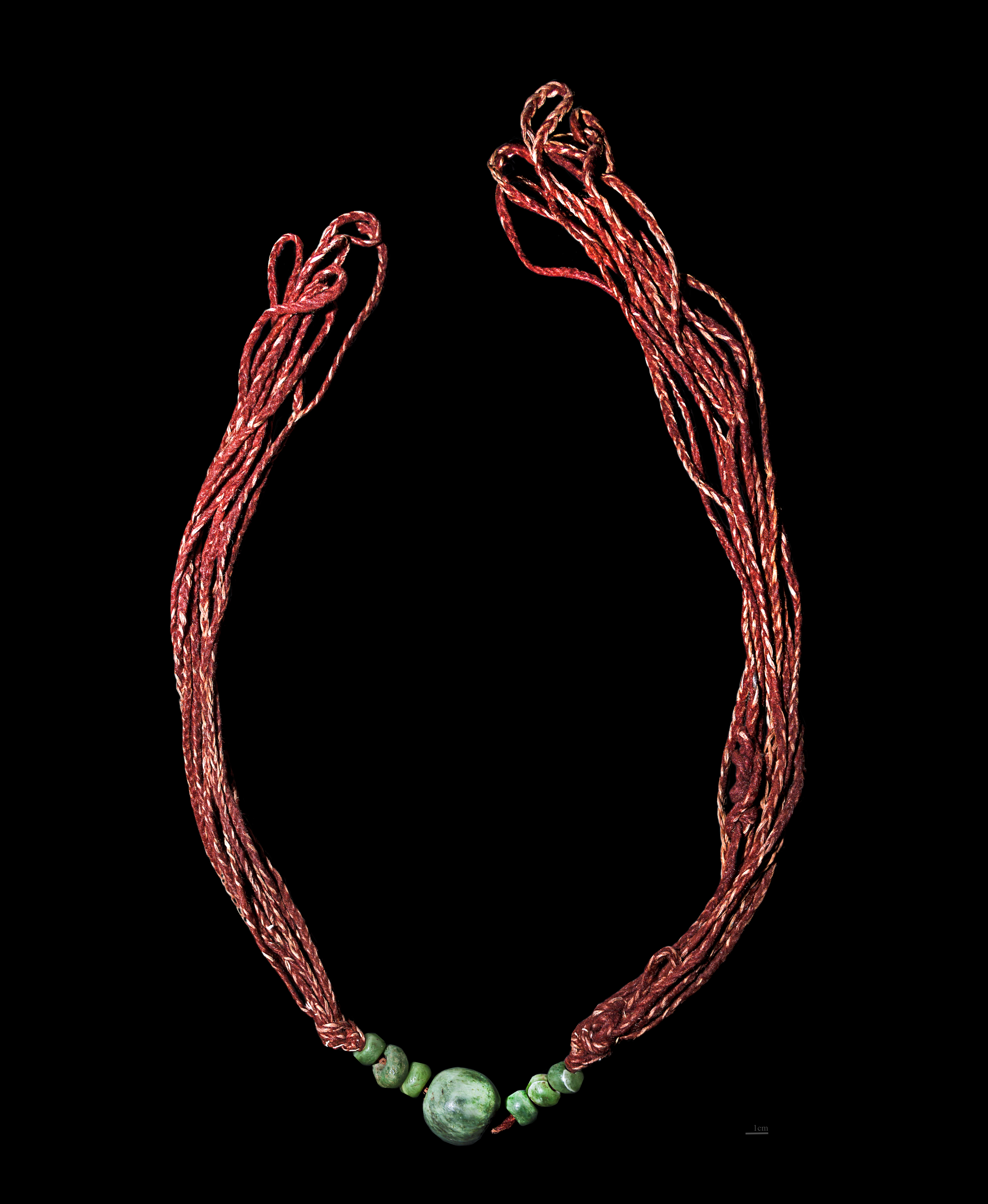
Necklace on New Caledonia flying fox hair MHNT
