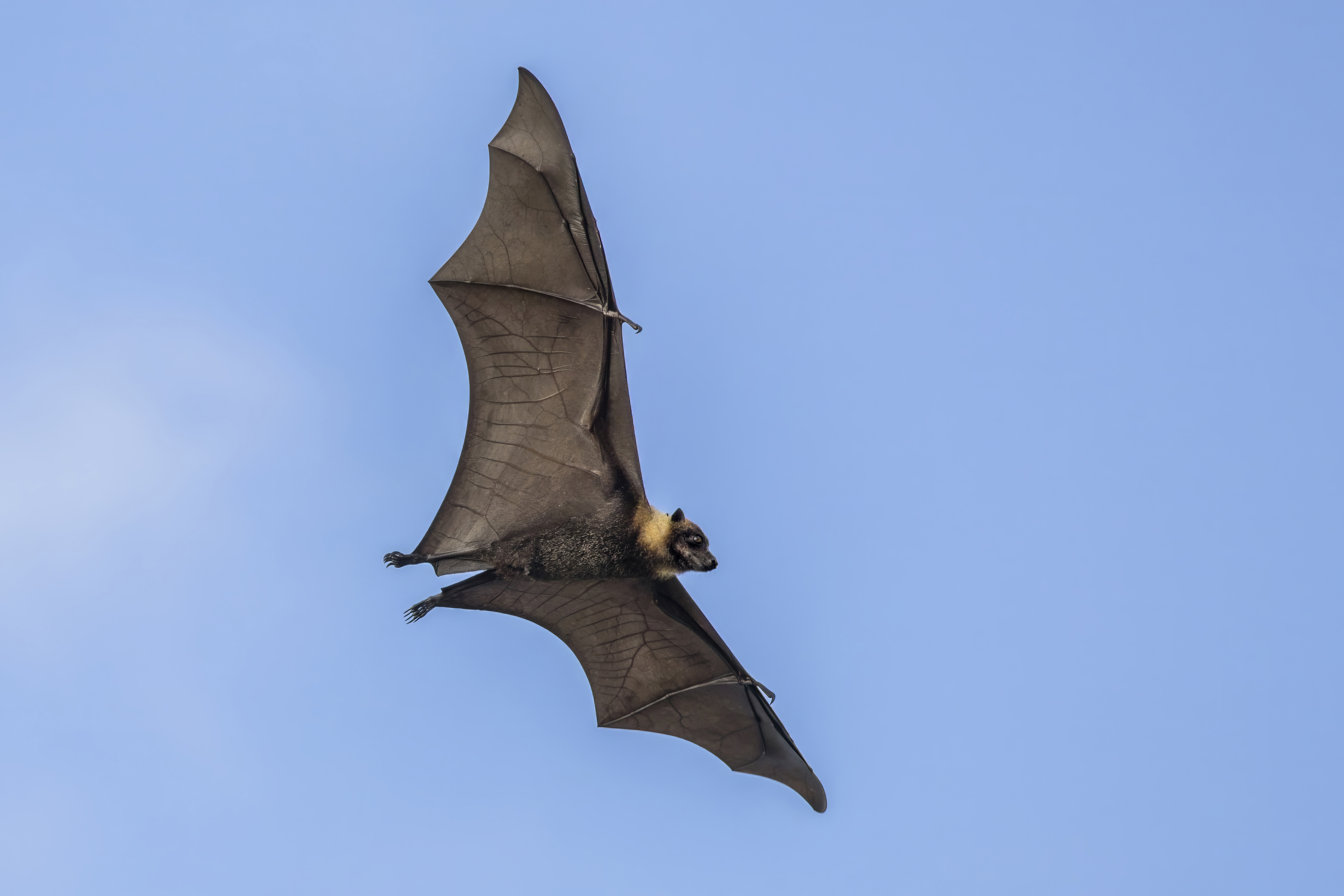
- Polynesian flying fox Pteropus tonganus, Taveuni, Fiji

Scientific classification
- Kingdom: Animalia
- Phylum: Chordata
- Class: Mammalia
- Order: Chiroptera
- Family: Pteropodidae
- Tribe: Pteropodini
- Genus: Pteropus; Brisson, 1762

Type species
- Vespertilio vampyrus niger (= Pteropus niger) Kerr, 1792
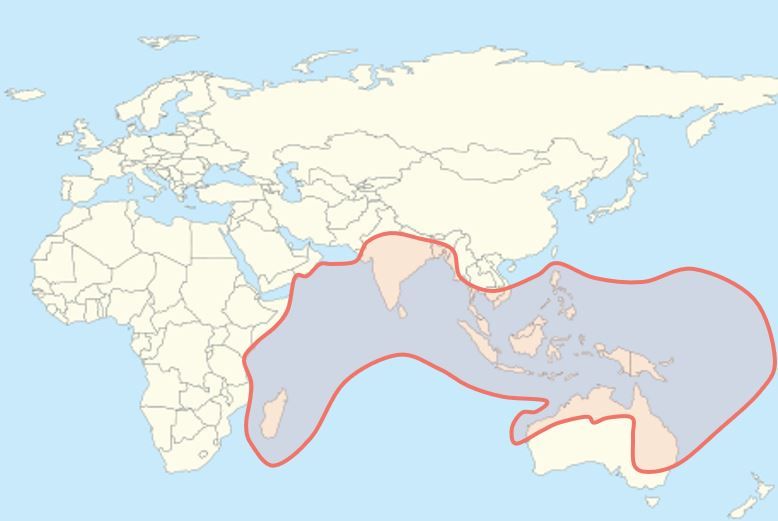
- Worldwide distribution of flying foxes

= Pteropus =

Pteropus Temporal range: Holocene

Genus of large bats

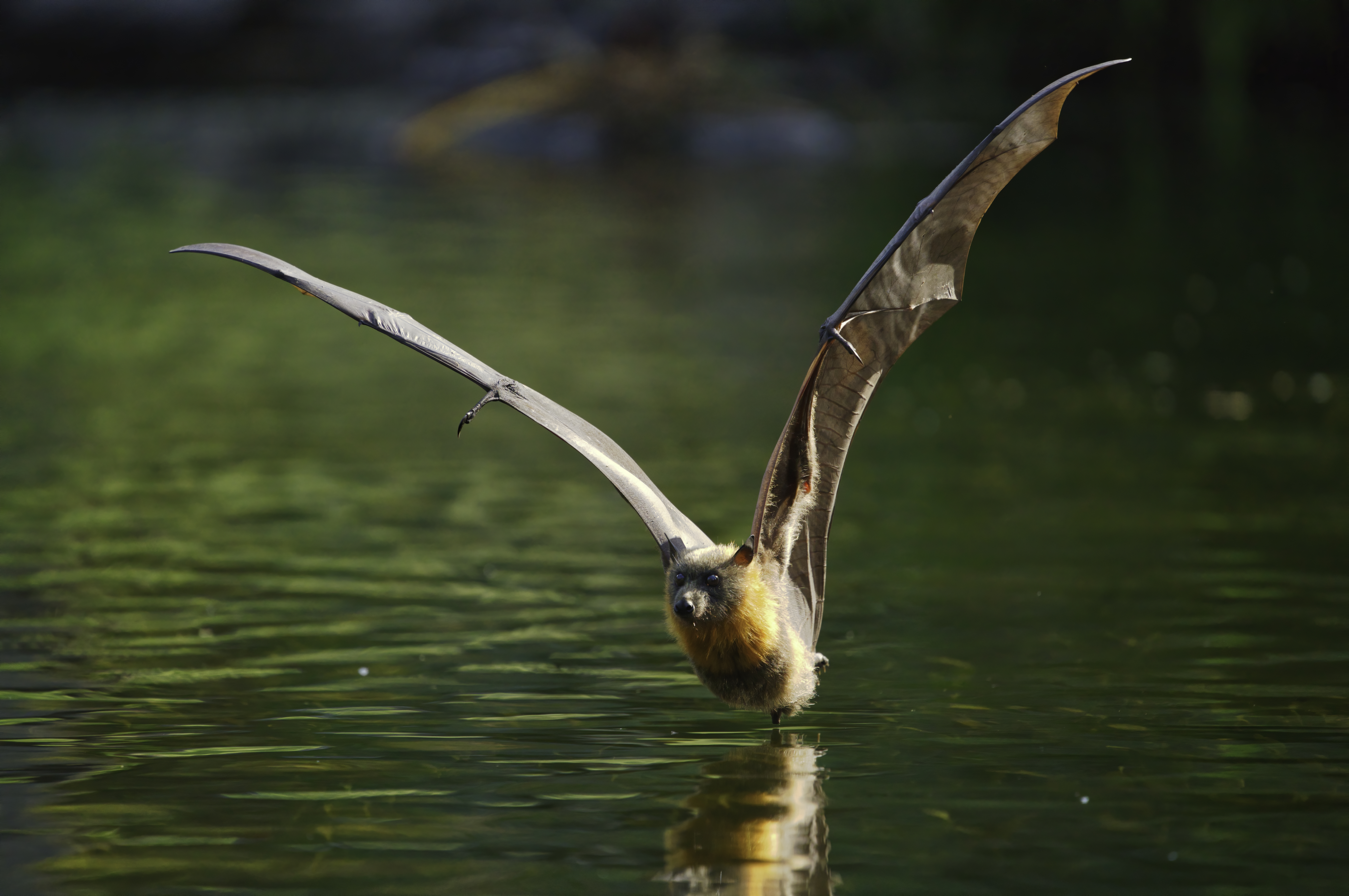
Grey-headed flying fox

Pteropus (suborder Yinpterochiroptera) is a genus of megabats which are among the largest bats in the world. They are commonly known as fruit bats or flying foxes, among other colloquial names. They live in South Asia, Southeast Asia, Australia, East Africa, and some oceanic islands in the Indian and Pacific Oceans. There are at least 60 extant species in the genus.

Flying foxes eat fruit and other plant matter, and occasionally consume insects as well. They locate resources with their keen sense of smell. Most, but not all, are nocturnal. They navigate with keen eyesight, as they cannot echolocate. They have long life spans and low reproductive outputs, with females of most species producing only one offspring per year. Their slow life history makes their populations vulnerable to threats such as overhunting, culling, and natural disasters. Six flying fox species have been made extinct in modern times by overhunting. Flying foxes are often persecuted for their real or perceived role in damaging crops. They are ecologically beneficial by assisting in the regeneration of forests via seed dispersal. They benefit ecosystems and human interests by pollinating plants.

Like other bats, flying foxes are relevant to humans as a source of disease, as they are the reservoirs of rare but fatal disease agents. These include Australian bat lyssavirus, which causes a rabies like illness, and Hendra virus. Seven known human deaths have resulted from these two diseases. Nipah virus is also transmitted by flying foxes, and it affects more people, with over 100 attributed fatalities. They have cultural significance to indigenous people, with appearances in traditional art, folklore, and weaponry. Their fur and teeth were used as currency in the past. Some cultures still use their teeth as currency today.

== Taxonomy and etymology ==
The genus name Pteropus, from Ancient Greek πτερόν, pterón, meaning "wing", and πούς, poús, meaning "foot", was coined by French zoologist Mathurin Jacques Brisson in 1762. Prior to 1998, genus authority was sometimes given to German naturalist Johann Christian Polycarp Erxleben. Although the Brisson publication (1762) predated the Erxleben publication (1777), thus giving him preference under the Principle of Priority, some authors gave preference to Erxleben as genus authority because Brisson's publication did not consistently use binomial nomenclature. In 1998, the International Commission on Zoological Nomenclature (ICZN) decided that Brisson's 1762 publication was a "rejected work" for nomenclatural purposes. Despite rejecting the majority of the publication, the ICZN decided to conserve a dozen generic names from the work and retain Brisson as authority, including Pteropus.

The type species of the genus is the Mauritian flying fox, Pteropus niger (described as Vespertilio vampyrus niger by Robert Kerr in 1792). The decision to designate P. niger as the type species was made by the ICZN through their plenary powers over biological nomenclature. The phrase "flying fox" has been used to refer to Pteropus bats since at least 1759.

=== Species ===
- - - Acerodon jubatus
    - Acerodon celebensis
  - - P. personatus
    - Neopteryx frosti
    - - - P. macrotis
        - - - P. mahaganus
            - - P. gilliardi
              - P. woodfordi
          - - P. molossinus
            - - †P. tokudae
              - P. pelagicus
      - - P. scapulatus
        - - P. lombocensis
          - - - - P. livingstonii
                - P. voeltzkowi
              - - - P. dasymallus
                  - P. pumilus
                - - - P. rodricensis
                    - P. vampyrus
                  - - - P. lylei
                      - P. medius
                    - - P. aldabrensis
                      - P. rufus
                      - - - P. seychellensis*
                          - - P. niger*
                            - - P. seychellensis*
                              - P. niger*
                - P. pselaphon
            - - - - P. capistratus
                  - P. ennisae
                - - P. vetulus
                  - - - P. nitendiensis
                      - P. tuberculatus
                    - - P. anetianus
                      - - P. samoensis
                        - P. fundatus
                        - - P. rayneri
                          - - P. rennelli
                            - P. cognatus
              - - P. poliocephalus
                - - P. ornatus
                  - - - - P. hypomelanus*
                        - - P. griseus
                          - - P. speciosus
                            - P. hypomelanus*
                      - - P. neohibernicus
                        - - P. conspicillatus
                          - P. alecto
                    - - - P. tonganus
                        - - P. ualanus
                          - P. admiralitatum
                      - - P. pohlei
                        - - P. mariannus
                          - - P. pelewensis*
                            - - P. yapensis
                              - P. pelewensis*

Phylogeny of Pteropus based on mitochondrial cytochrome b and rRNA12S genes. Species without enough data are excluded.

== Description ==
=== External characteristics ===
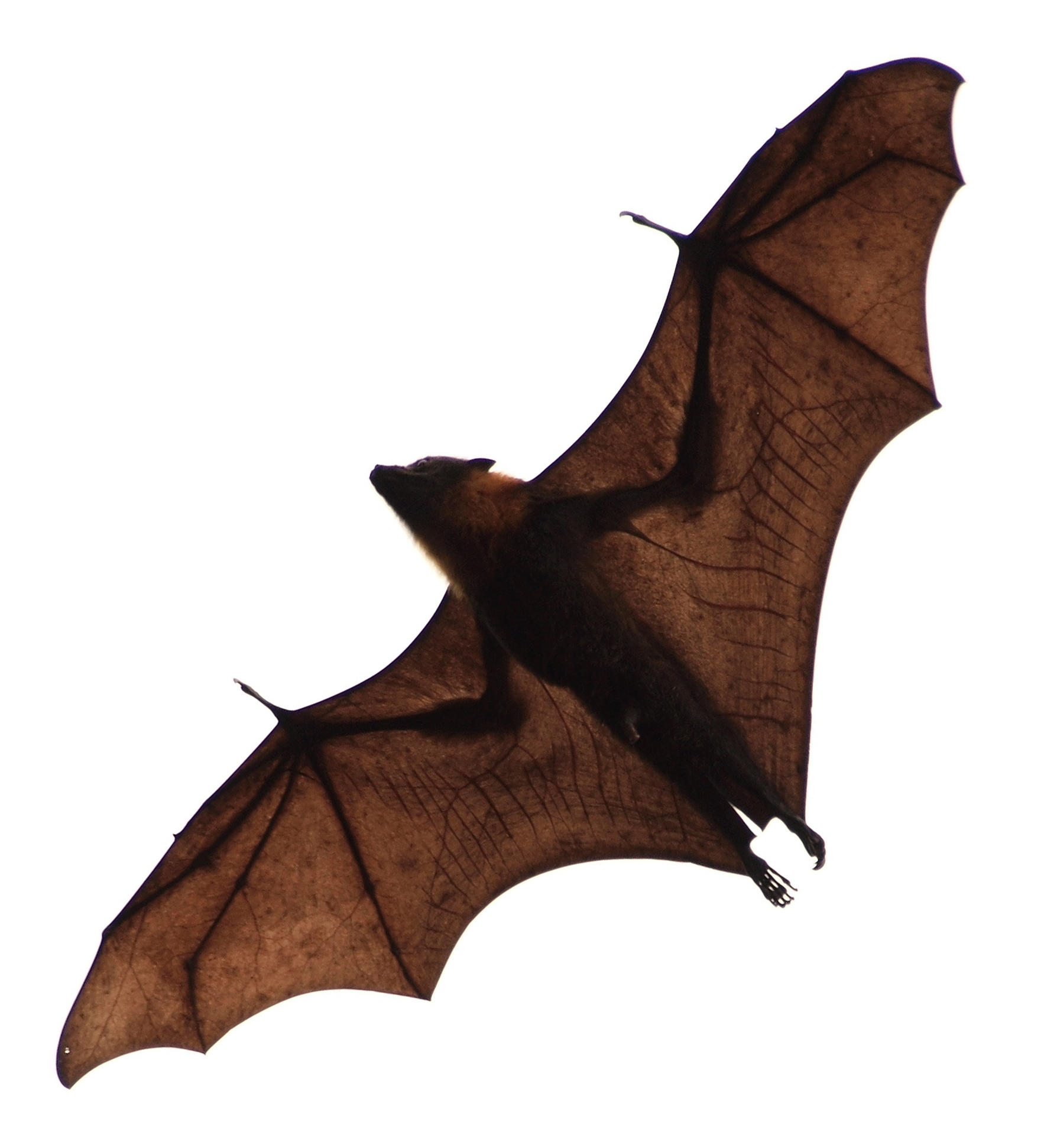
Flying fox in flight

Flying fox species vary in body weight, ranging from 120–1,600 g (0.26–3.53 lb). Across all species, males are usually larger than females. The large flying fox has the longest forearm length and reported wingspan of any bat species, but some bat species exceed it in weight. Its wingspan is up to 1.5 m (4 ft 11 in), and it can weigh up to 1.1 kg (2 1/2 lb). The Indian and great flying foxes are heavier, at 1.6 and 1.45 kg (3 1/2 and 3 1/4 lb), respectively. Outside this genus, the giant golden-crowned flying fox (genus Acerodon) is the only bat with similar dimensions.

Most flying fox species are considerably smaller and generally weigh less than 600 g (21 oz). Smaller species such as the masked, Temminck's, Guam, and dwarf flying foxes all weigh less than 170 g (6 oz).

The pelage is long and silky with a dense underfur. In many species, individuals have a "mantle" of contrasting fur color on the back of their head, the shoulders, and the upper back. They lack tails. As the common name "flying fox" suggests, their heads resemble that of a small fox because of their small ears and large eyes. Females have one pair of mammae located in the chest region. Their ears are long and pointed at the tip and lack tragi, the outer margin of each ear forming an unbroken ring. The toes have sharp, curved claws. While microbats only have a claw on each thumb of their forelimbs, flying foxes additionally have a claw on each index finger.

=== Skull and dentition ===
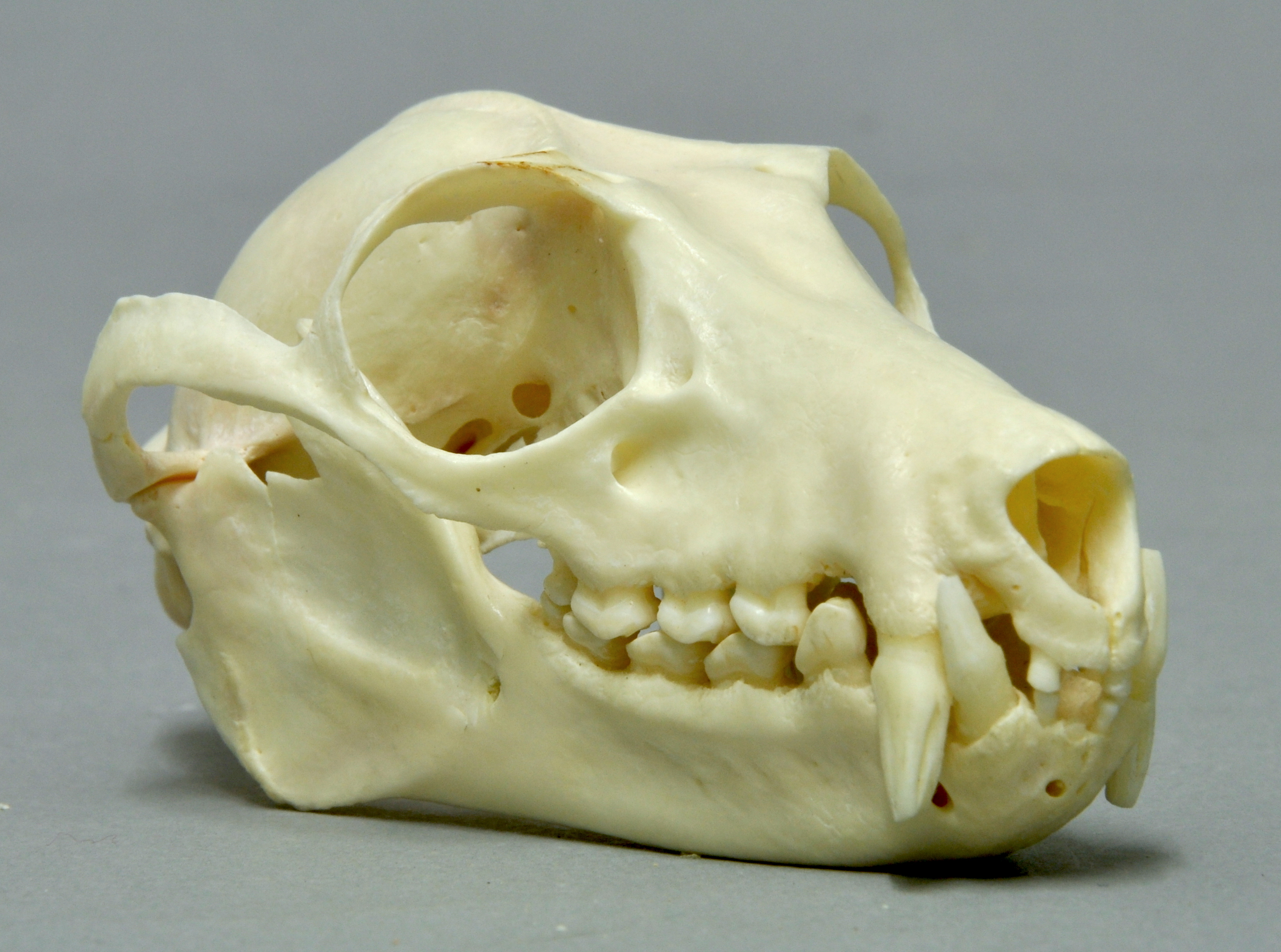
Skull of the black-eared flying fox

The skulls of Pteropus species are composed of 24 bones, the snout is made of 7, the cranium of 16 and the mandible is a single bone. It has a large and bulbous braincase. Like all mammals, flying foxes have three middle ear ossicles which assist in transmitting sound to the brain. Flying fox skulls continue to develop after they are born. Compared to adults, young flying foxes have very short snouts; as they reach maturity, the maxilla elongates, gaining bone between the zygomatic processes and the canine teeth.

Based on the grey-headed flying fox's development, pups are born with some milk teeth already erupted: canines and incisors. By 9 days old, all the milk teeth have emerged, with a dental formula of 2.1.2.02.1.2.0 and a total of 20 teeth. By 140 days old (4.6 months), all the milk teeth have fallen and been replaced by permanent teeth. The canines are usually replaced first, followed by the premolars, incisors, and then molars. The adult dental formula is 2.1.3.22.1.3.3 for a total of 34 teeth. The occlusal surface of the molars is generally smooth but with longitudinal furrows.

=== Internal systems ===
Flying foxes have large hearts and a relatively fast heart rate: resting individuals have a heart rate of 100–400 beats per minute.

Flying foxes have simple digestive tracts; the time between ingestion and excretion is as short as 12 minutes. They lack both a cecum and an appendix. The stomach has marked cardiac and fundic regions.

=== Intelligence ===
The megabats, including flying foxes, have the greatest encephalization quotient (brain size relative to body size) of any bat family at 1.20. This value is equivalent to that of domestic dogs. Flying foxes display behaviors that indicate a reliance on long-term information storage. Though they have wide-ranging movements and cover thousands of square kilometers annually, they are consistently able to locate the same resource patches and roosts. They will visit these resource patches consistently in a strategy known as trap-lining. They can also be conditioned to perform behaviors, such as one study where spectacled flying foxes were trained to pull a lever using juice as a reinforcement. In a follow-up to the initial study, individuals who had learned to pull the lever to receive juice still did so 3.5 years later.

=== Senses ===
==== Smell ====
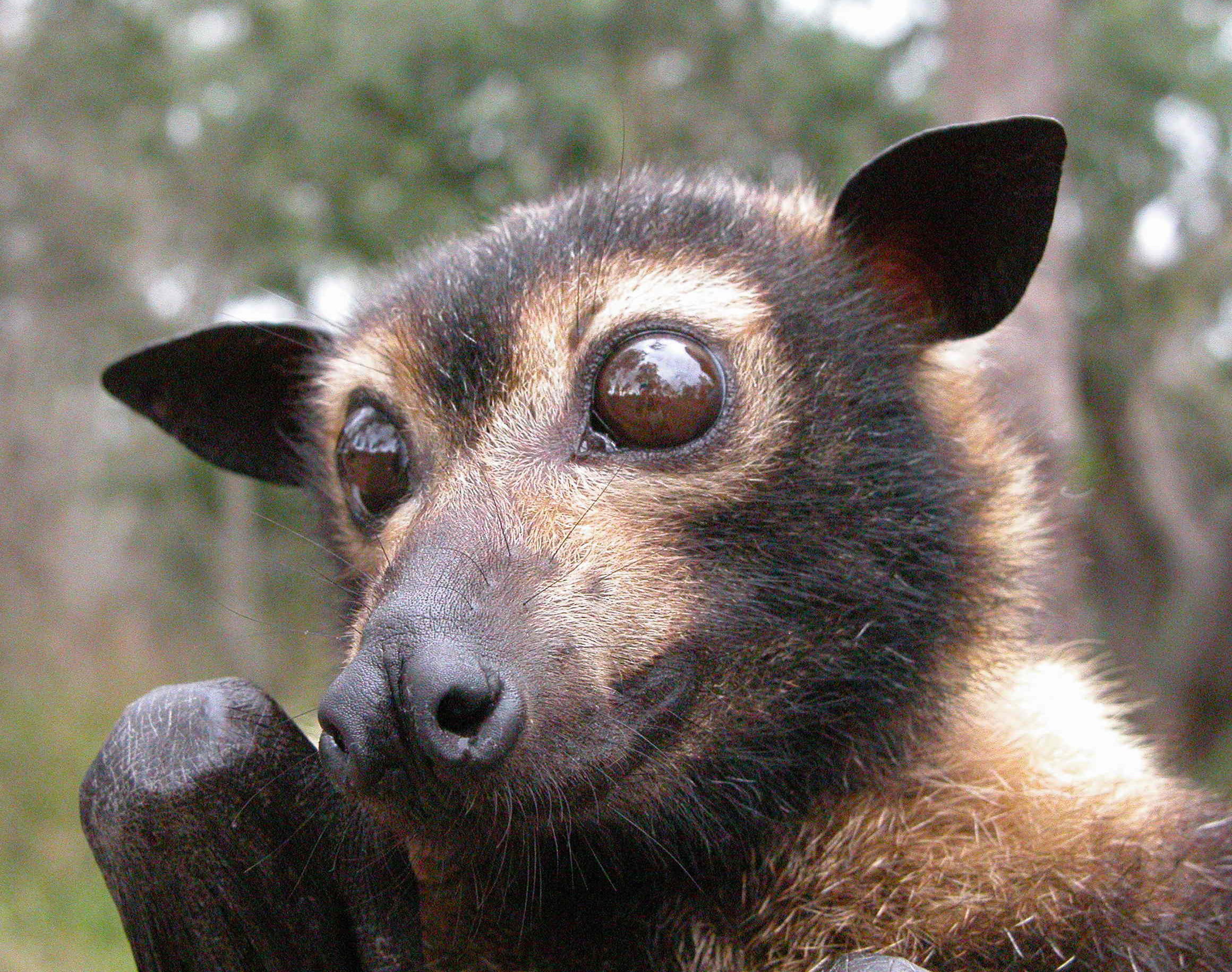
The prominent eyes of the spectacled flying fox

Flying foxes rely heavily on their sense of smell. They have large olfactory bulbs to process scents. They use scent to locate food, for mothers to locate their pups, and for mates to locate each other. Males have enlarged androgen-sensitive sebaceous glands on their shoulders that they use for scent-marking their territories, particularly during the mating season. The secretions of these glands vary by species—of the 65 chemical compounds identified from the glands of four species, no compound was found in all species. Males also engage in "urine washing", meaning that they coat themselves in their own urine.

==== Sight ====
Flying foxes do not echolocate, and therefore rely on sight to navigate. Their eyes are relatively large and positioned on the front of their heads, giving them binocular vision. Like most mammals, though not primates, they are dichromatic. They have both rods and cones; they have "blue" cones that detect short-wavelength light and "green" cones that detect medium-to-long-wavelengths. The rods greatly outnumber the cones, however, as cones comprise only 0.5% of photoreceptors. Flying foxes are adapted to seeing in low-light conditions.

== Evolutionary history ==
- Pteropodidae
  - Melonycteris
  - - Nyctimene
    - - - Pteralopex
        - Eidolon
      - - - Acerodon
          - Pteropus
        - - - Notopteris
            - - - Aproteles
                - Dobsonia
              - - - Syconycteris
                  - Macroglossus
                - - - Cynopterus
                    - - Megaerops
                      - Ptenochirus
                  - - Thoopterus
                    - Chironax
                    - Aethalops
                    - Balionycteris
          - - - Eonycteris
              - - Stenonycteris
                - Rousettus
            - - - Epomops
                - - Epomophorus
                  - Micropteropus
              - - Megaloglossus
                - - Lissonycteris
                  - Myonycteris

Phylogeny of Pteropodidae

Flying foxes are poorly represented in the fossil record. Relative to the current number of extant species, the Pteropodidae has one of the most incomplete fossil records of any bat group. As of 2014, no flying fox fossils are known from before the Holocene. Many flying foxes live in the tropics, where conditions for fossilization are poor. Based on molecular evolution, flying foxes diverged from a common ancestor with Rousettus 28–18 million years ago and from their sister taxa Neopteryx and Acerodon 6.6–10.6 million years ago. Neopteryx, Acerodon, Desmalopex, Melonycteris, Mirimiri, Pteralopex, and Styloctenium are all relatively closely related to the flying foxes, as they are the other members of its subfamily Pteropodinae.

Phylogenetic analysis indicates that flying foxes diversified rapidly in an explosive evolutionary radiation, creating many taxa in a relatively short time frame. Most flying fox lineages emerged after the Zanclean, with two major clades created: one consisting of the Indian Ocean species and the other of the Melanesian, Micronesian, Australian, and insular Southeast Asian species. Flying foxes likely originated on mainland Asia; molecular data suggests that there were at least three colonization events into the Indian Ocean. One event resulted in Livingstone's fruit bat and the Pemba flying fox, which are the westernmost flying foxes. A second colonization event resulted in the Rodrigues flying fox to Rodrigues Island; while a third event resulted in several species diverging to Mauritius, the Seychelles, Madagascar, and Aldabra.

With one possible exception - the masked flying fox (P. personatus), flying foxes are likely monophyletic. There are over 60 extant species of flying fox. Flying foxes are now present from the western Indian Ocean midway through the Pacific Ocean as far east as the Cook Islands. They are found in tropical and subtropical climates.

== Biology and ecology ==
=== Reproduction and life cycle ===
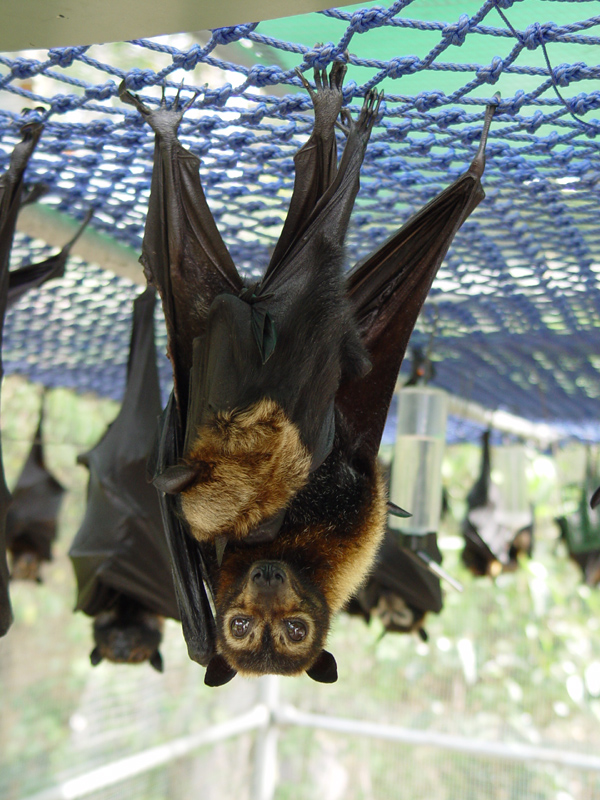
Female spectacled flying fox with pup

Many species of flying fox are polygynandrous, meaning that each individual will mate with several other individuals. The Samoa flying fox is a notable exception because it is monogamous. Flying fox sexual behaviors include oral sex in addition to intercourse, with fellatio and cunnilingus observed between opposite sexes, as well as homosexual fellatio in at least one species, the Bonin flying fox. Opposite-sex oral sex is associated with increased duration of intercourse, while same-sex fellatio is hypothesized to encourage colony formation of otherwise-antagonistic males in colder climates.

Flying fox gestation length varies among species; gestation length is 140–190 days (4.6–6.3 months). Females have a litter size of one young at a time, called a pup. Twins have been occasionally documented in some species, however. Twins can be fraternal, identical, or the result of superfetation. Pups are altricial and sparsely furred at birth, thereby dependent on their mothers for care. Pups are relatively small at birth, weighing approximately 12% of the mother's weight. Bats in other genera can have pups that weigh as much as 30% of the mother's weight at birth. They cling to their mothers' abdomens, gripping her fur with their thumb claws and teeth; females carry the pups for the first several weeks of life. After this, the females may leave the pups behind at the roost at night while they forage. As with nearly all bat species, males do not assist females in parental care. While male flying foxes of at least one species, the Bismarck masked flying fox, can lactate, it is unclear if the lactation is functional and males actually nurse pups or if it is a result of stress or malnutrition. Pups fledge beginning at 3 months old, but may not be weaned until 4–6 months old. Pups may stay with their mothers until age one. Flying foxes do not reach sexual maturity until 1.5–2 years old. Females can have up to two litters annually, though one is the norm due to the long weaning period. Most flying foxes are seasonal breeders and give birth in the spring, though the Mariana fruit bat seems to have aseasonal breeding with new pups documented throughout the year. Females remain fertile with no decrease in reproductive capability for at least the first 12 or 13 years of life.

Flying foxes, like all bats, are long-lived relative to their size. In the wild, average lifespans are likely 15 years. However, individuals part of populations that face excessive disturbance may have lifespans as short as 7.1 years. In captivity, individuals can live approximately 20–28 years. The longest-lived flying fox was an Indian flying fox named Statler, who was a resident at Bat World Sanctuary for his last few years. He was born at a zoo in 1987, and was 34 years old at the time of his death.

=== Social systems ===
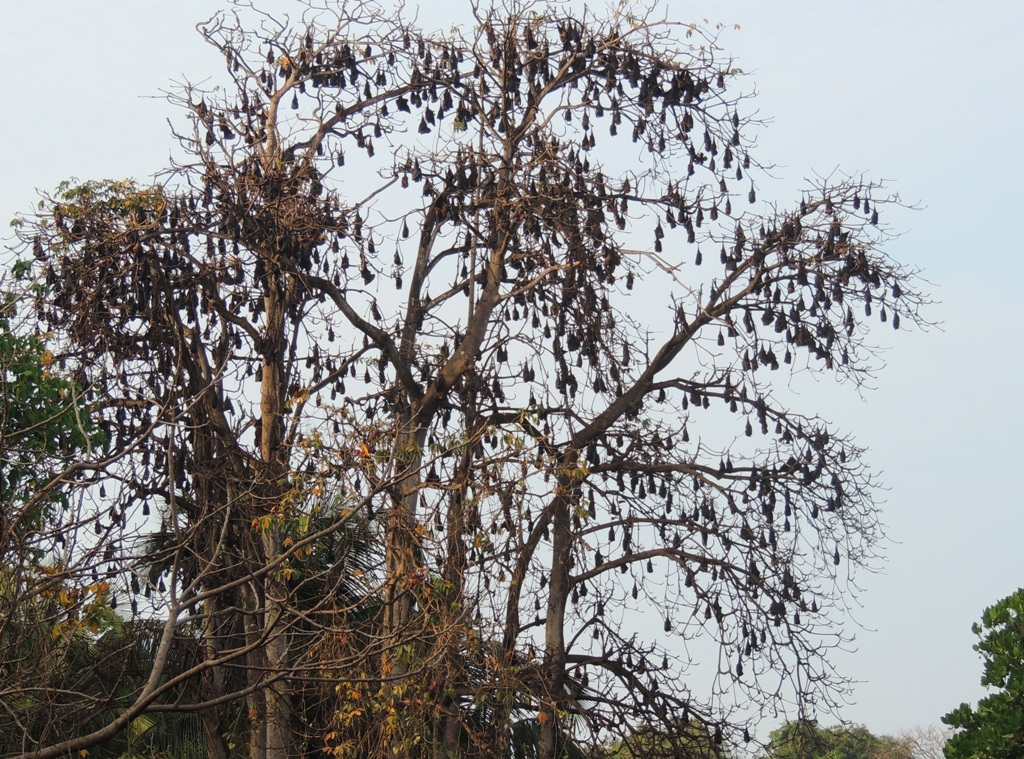
A roosting colony of Indian flying foxes

Most flying fox species are gregarious and form large aggregations of individuals called colonies or "camps." The large flying fox forms colonies of up to 15,000 individuals, while the little red flying fox forms colonies of up to 100,000 individuals. A few species and subspecies, such as Orii's flying fox (P. dasymallus inopinatus) and the Seram fruit bat, are solitary.

Colony size varies throughout the year in response to biological needs. The grey-headed flying fox forms harems during the breeding season consisting of one male and up to six females. These colonies break up after the breeding season is over. In the Bonin flying fox, colony formation is based on both the sex and age of individuals, as well as the season. In the winter breeding season, adult females will form colonies that include a few adult males (likely harems). Adult males who do not roost with females will form colonies with other adult and subadult males. Subadults will form mixed-sex "subadult groups" with each other. In the summer, however, individuals are solitary, with the exception of nursing females, who roost with their pups.

=== Diet and foraging ===
Flying foxes consume 25–35% of their body weight daily. They are generalists that will consume a variety of items to meet their nutritional needs. Food items include fruit, flowers, nectar, and leaves. They will sometimes deliberately consume insects such as cicadas as well. In Australia, eucalypt blossoms and pollen are preferred food sources, followed by Melaleuca and Banksia flowers They feed on a wide variety of crops as well, causing conflicts with farmers. Crops eaten by flying foxes include sisal, cashew, pineapple, areca, breadfruit, jackfruit, neem, papaya, citrus, fig, mango, banana, avocado, guava, sugar cane, tamarind, grapes, and more.

In captivity, the recommended diet for flying foxes consists of two-thirds hard fruits like pears and apples and one-third soft fruits. Bananas and other high-fiber fruits should only be offered occasionally, as flying foxes are not adapted to high-fiber diets. Protein supplements are recommended for captive flying foxes; other supplements such as vitamin C, calcium, chondroitin sulfate, and glucosamine can be recommended periodically.

The majority of flying fox species are nocturnal and forage at night. A few island species and subspecies are diurnal, however, hypothesized as a response to a lack of predators. Diurnal taxa include P. melanotus natalis, the Mauritian flying fox, the Caroline flying fox, P. p. insularis, and the Seychelles fruit bat. Foraging resources are often far from roosts, with individuals traveling up to 40–60 km (25–37 mi) to reach them. Flying foxes can travel at 6 m/s (13 mph) for three hours or more, and can reach top speeds of 8.6 m/s (19 mph). Some colonial species will forage in groups, especially when resources are abundant. Less social species will forage alone. When they land on a tree with food, they will hang onto the branch with their clawed hind feet and use their clawed thumbs to pull branches bearing flowers or fruits towards them. As they forage on fruit, flying foxes will compress the fruit against the palate with the tongue to squeeze out and consume the juices. The rest of the fruit is then discarded in "ejecta pellets", which are pellets of dry fruit pulp that are dropped onto the floor beneath the tree.

=== Role in ecosystems ===
Flying foxes have important roles as seed dispersers and pollinators. They help spread the seeds in the fruit they eat by discarding them in ejecta pellets or through their guano. In Madagascar, fig seeds have better germination success if they have passed through the gut of a flying fox, which is important because fig trees are a vital pioneer species in regenerating lost forest. Flying foxes can have a gut transit time as fast as 12 minutes, but alternatively, seeds can be retained in the gut for as long as 20 hours. As the flying foxes travel large distances, seeds can be deposited up to 20 km (12 mi) from the parent tree. They are particularly important in fragmented forests, as many other frugivores are terrestrial and often confined to forest fragments. Flying foxes have the capability to spread seeds beyond the forest fragments through flight.

Flying foxes pollinate a variety of plants, including the economically valuable durian. They forage on its nectar in such a way that the flowers (and eventual fruit production) are not usually harmed. Flying fox pollination has a positive effect on durian reproductive success, suggesting that both flying foxes and durian trees benefit from this relationship.

== Conservation ==
=== Conservation status ===
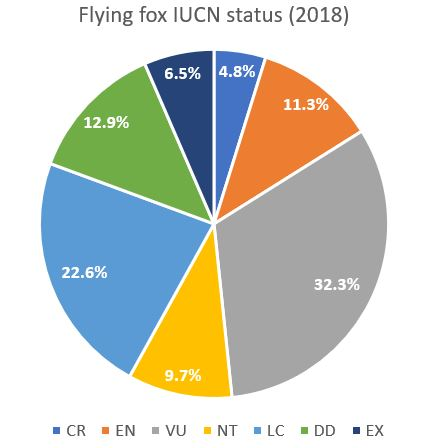
IUCN status of Pteropus species

Of the 62 flying fox species evaluated by the IUCN as of 2018, 3 are considered critically endangered: the Aru flying fox, Livingstone's fruit bat, and the Vanikoro flying fox. Another 7 species are listed as endangered; 20 are listed as vulnerable, 6 as near threatened, 14 as least concern, and 8 as data deficient. A further 4 are listed as extinct: the dusky flying fox, the large Palau flying fox, the small Mauritian flying fox, and the Guam flying fox. Over half of the species are threatened today with extinction, and in particular in the Pacific, a number of species have died out as a result of hunting, deforestation, and predation by invasive species. Six flying fox species are believed to have gone extinct from 1864 to 2014: the Guam, large Palau, small Mauritian, dusky, large Samoan, and the small Samoan flying foxes.

=== Legal status ===
All species of Pteropus are placed on Appendix II of CITES and 10 on Appendix I, which restricts international trade. Individual species have different legal protections from hunting and domestic trade that reflect the environmental laws of the countries where they are found.

In some countries such as Bangladesh, Sri Lanka, and Thailand, flying foxes are absolutely protected from harm under the Wildlife Preservation and Security Act of 2012, Fauna and Flora Protection Ordinance of 1937, and Wildlife Protection and Reservation Act of 1992, respectively. However, in Thailand, flying fox poaching and the illegal bushmeat trade still occurs outside of protected areas. The large flying fox and the small flying fox are particularly prone to poaching and roost disturbance.

In other countries, such as Australia, Japan, and the United States, some species of conservation concern are protected under national environmental legislation, while others are not. In Australia, two flying foxes are listed under the Environment Protection and Biodiversity Conservation Act of 1999: the grey-headed and spectacled flying foxes are listed as "vulnerable." Farmers can apply for permits to kill flying foxes when they are causing crop damage.

Several flying fox species occur in Japan. The Bonin flying fox has been a Natural Monument of Japan since 1969, which means that it is illegal to capture or disturb them without appropriate permits. Two subspecies of the Ryukyu flying fox (P. d. dasymallus and P. d. daitoensis) are also listed as Natural Monuments. Flying foxes are not designated game species in Japan, and therefore cannot be legally hunted per the Wildlife Protection and Hunting Law. The Bonin flying fox and P. d. daitoensis are also listed as National Endangered Species, meaning that they cannot be killed or harmed; furthermore, the sale or transfer of live or dead individuals in whole or part is also prohibited without permits.

Despite not occurring in the continental United States, several species and subspecies are listed under its Endangered Species Act of 1973. Pteropus mariannus mariannus—a subspecies of the Mariana fruit bat—is listed as threatened while the Rodrigues flying fox and Guam flying fox are listed as endangered. Additionally, the U. S. government has been petitioned to list the Aru flying fox and Bonin flying fox as threatened or endangered.

In such countries as India and Pakistan, flying foxes explicitly have no legal protection. In India, they are listed as "vermin" under the Wildlife Protection Act of 1972. Pakistan's only flying fox, the Indian flying fox, is listed under Schedule 4 of the Punjab Wildlife (Protection, Preservation, Conservation and Management) Act of 1974, meaning that it has no legal protections and can be hunted. In Mauritius, flying foxes were formerly protected but are now legally culled at a large scale. In 2015, the Mauritian government passed the Native Terrestrial Biodiversity And National Parks Act, which legalized culling of the Mauritian flying fox. This was done to reduce the bat's perceived threat to crops. In Mauritius, over 40,000 Mauritian flying foxes were culled in a two-year period, reducing its population by an estimated 45%. This decision was viewed with controversy, with researchers stating "Because they spread seeds and pollinate flowers, flying foxes are vital for regenerating lost forests."

Legal protection can vary within a country as well, such as in Malaysia. Under the 1990 Protection of Wild Life Amendment Order, flying foxes can be hunted with a permit; each permit is good for killing up to 50 flying foxes. Permits cost U.S.$8 each. However, under the Protection of WildLife Act of 1972, flying foxes can be killed without permits if they are causing damage or if there is "reason to believe that it is about to cause serious damage" to crops. In 2012, the Malaysian state of Terengganu issued a moratorium on hunting flying foxes. In Sarawak, all bat species are listed as "Protected" and hunting them is not legal.

=== Factors causing decline ===
==== Anthropogenic sources ====
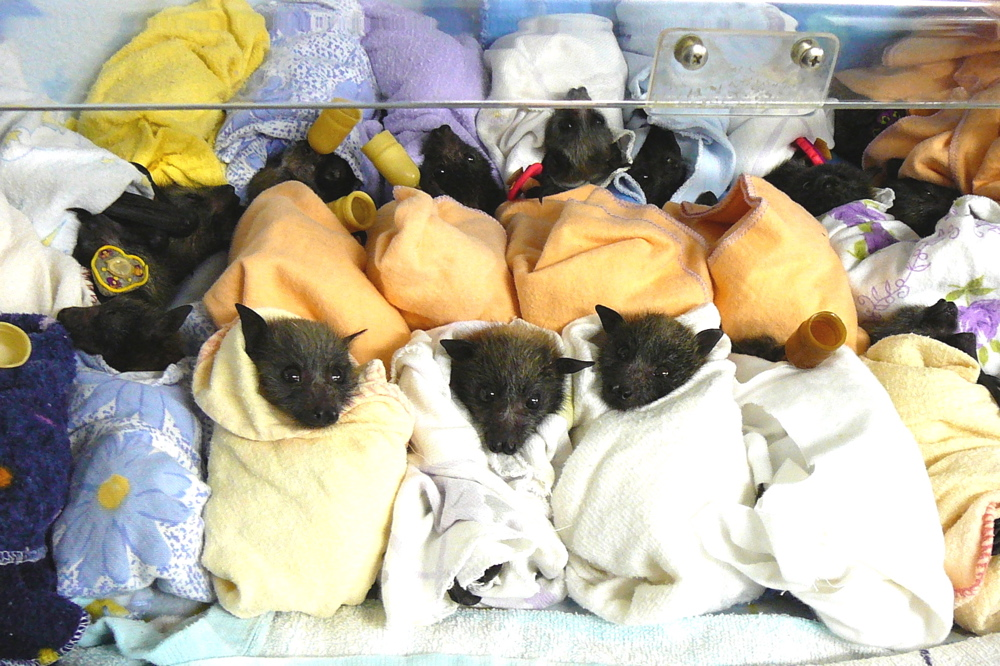
Abandoned grey-headed flying fox pups after a cyclone

Flying foxes species are declining or going extinct as a result of several human impacts to their environments, in addition to natural phenomena. Their populations are especially vulnerable to threats because the litter size is usually only individual and females generally only have one litter per year. Even when nearly every female (90%) successfully produces and raises young, if a population's mortality rate exceeds 22% annually, then it will steadily decline.

Invasive species, such as the brown tree snake, can seriously affect populations; the brown tree snake consumes so many pups that it reduced the recruitment of the Guam population of the Mariana fruit bat to essentially zero.

Many flying fox species are threatened by overhunting. While they have long been a dietary component of indigenous people, expanding human population and more efficient weapons have resulted in population declines, local extinctions, and extinctions. Overhunting is believed to be the primary cause of extinction for the small Mauritian flying fox and the Guam flying fox.

Flying foxes are also threatened with excessive culling due to conflict with farmers. They are shot, beaten to death, or poisoned to reduce their populations. Mortality also occurs via accidental entanglement into netting used to prevent the bats from eating fruit. Culling can dramatically reduce flying fox populations. Flying foxes are also killed by electrocution. In one Australian orchard, it is estimated that over 21,000 bats were electrocuted to death in an 8-week period. Farmers construct electrified grids over their fruit trees to kill flying foxes before they can consume their crop. The grids are questionably effective at preventing crop loss, with one farmer who operated such a grid estimating that they still lost 100–120 tonnes (110–130 short tons) of fruit to flying foxes in a year. Some electrocution deaths are also accidental, such as when bats fly into overhead power lines.

Climate change causes flying fox mortality and a source of concern for species persistence. Extreme heat waves in Australia have been responsible for the deaths of more than 30,000 Australian flying foxes from 1994 to 2008. Females and young bats are most susceptible to extreme heat, which affects a population's ability to recover. Flying foxes are threatened by sea level rise associated with climate change, as several taxa are endemic to low-lying atolls.

==== Natural sources ====
Because many species are endemic to a single island, they are vulnerable to random events such as typhoons. A 1979 typhoon halved the remaining population of the Rodrigues flying fox. Typhoons result in indirect mortality as well: Because they defoliate the trees, flying foxes are more visible and easily hunted by humans. Food resources for the bats become scarce after major storms, and flying foxes resort to riskier foraging strategies such as consuming fallen fruit off the ground. There, they are more vulnerable to depredation by domestic cats, dogs, and pigs.

Flying foxes are also threatened by disease such as tick paralysis. Tick paralysis affects the spectacled flying fox, and is responsible for an estimated 1% of its annual mortality.

=== Captive breeding ===
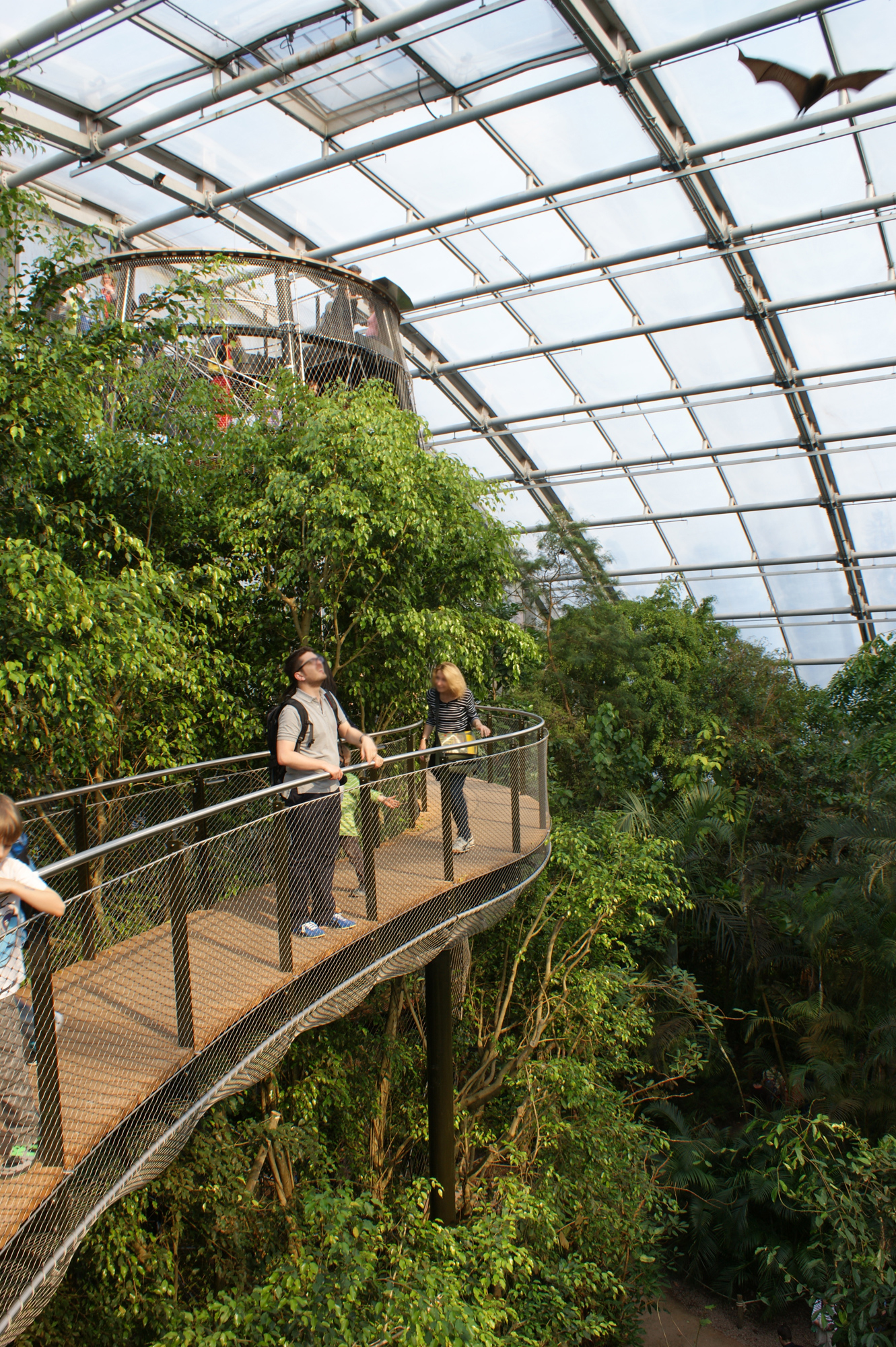
A Rodrigues flying fox flying at the Zürich Zoologischer Garten

Several species of endangered flying fox are bred in captivity to augment their population sizes. Critically endangered Livingstone's fruit bats were taken from the wild starting in 1995 to create a captive breeding program. All captive individuals remain the property of the Comorian government. 17 individuals were collected from the wild; with breeding, there are 71 in captivity as of 2017. Individuals are held at the Jersey Zoo and the Bristol Zoo. Though the program has been successful in increasing the population, caretakers of the captive population have had to deal with husbandry issues such as obesity and cardiomyopathy. Relative to their wild counterparts, captive bats have a higher percentage of body fat and a lower percentage of muscle mass. The problem is pronounced in dominant males, which are the most sedentary. Addressing these concerns involves increasing flight space so that the animals can exercise adequately. Keepers are also exploring ways of distributing food within enclosures to encourage exercise.

The endangered Rodrigues flying fox has been bred in captivity with great success. By 1979, only 70–100 individuals were left in the world. In 1976, 25 individuals were removed from the wild by Durrell Wildlife Conservation Trust to begin a breeding program. In 1988, the breeding program was called "undoubtedly the most important chiropteran breeding project now in operation." By 2016, there were 180 individuals in 16 zoos across the United States alone. Worldwide, 46 zoos participate in the Rodrigues flying fox breeding program as of 2017.

== Relationship to people ==
=== Food ===
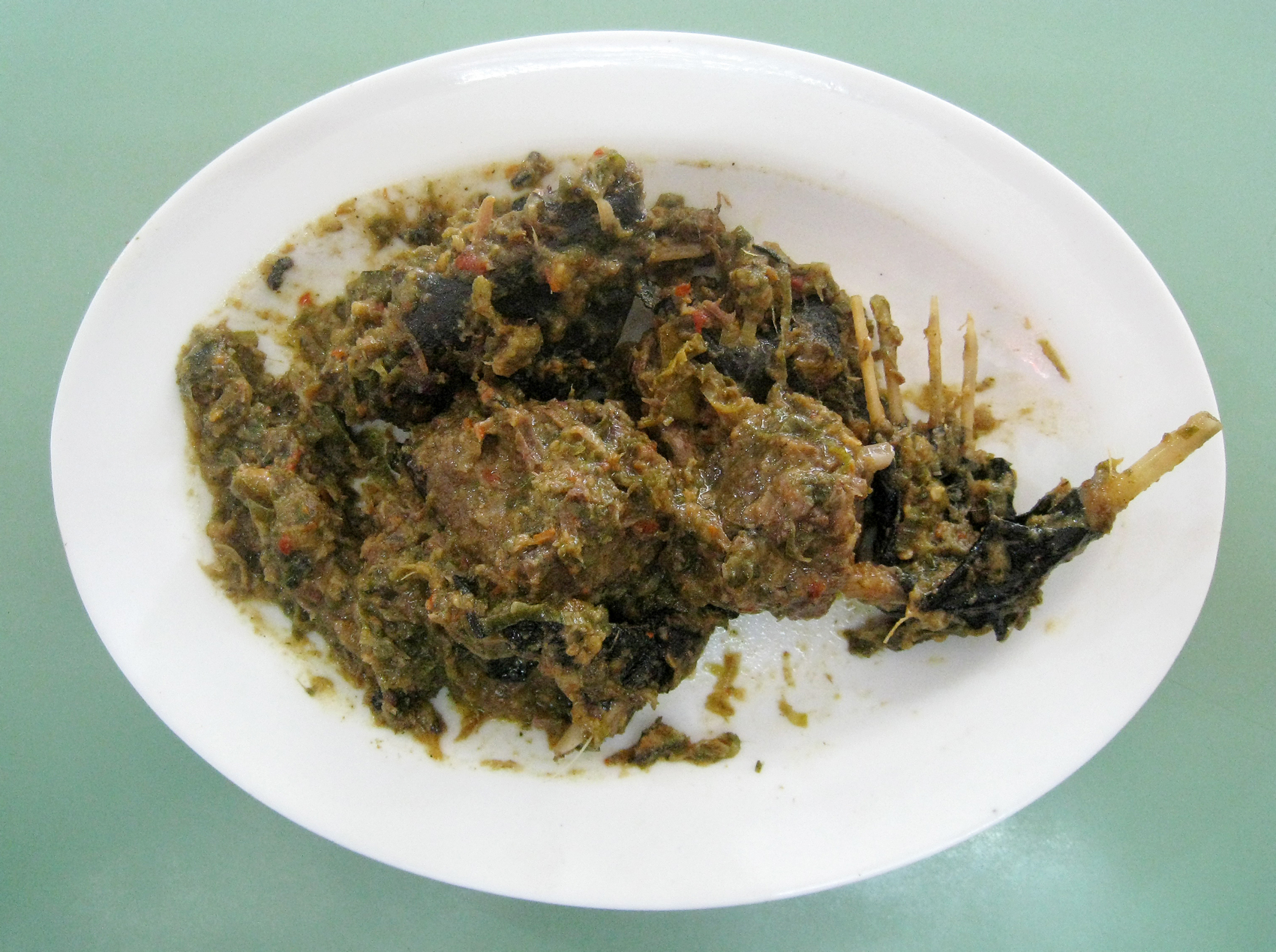
An Indonesian dish made with Paniki (flying fox meat)

Many flying foxes species are killed for bushmeat. The bushmeat harvest is often unsustainable, often resulting in severe population decline or local extinction. Flying foxes are killed and sold for bushmeat in several countries in Southeast Asia, South Asia, and Oceania, including Indonesia, Malaysia, Papua New Guinea, the Philippines, Bangladesh, China, Fiji, and Guam. Flying fox consumption is particularly common in countries with low food security and lack of environmental regulation. In some cultures in the region, however, eating flying fox meat is taboo. In Namoluk, locals are repulsed by the idea of eating flying foxes because the flying foxes urinate on themselves. In predominately Muslim regions such as much of Indonesia, flying foxes are rarely consumed because of halal dietary restrictions.

North Sulawesi has the greatest demand for flying fox bushmeat. Despite being in Muslim-majority Indonesia, North Sulawesi is predominately Christian; therefore, many locals do not follow halal guidelines prohibiting flying fox consumption. In Manado, most local people consume flying fox meat at least once a month. The frequency of flying fox consumption increases tenfold around holidays. Locals believe that "unique meat" from undomesticated animals should be served on special occasions to "enliven the atmosphere." Suggestions to make the flying fox bushmeat trade more sustainable include enforcing a quota system for harvesting, encouraging hunters to release female and juvenile individuals, and providing economic alternatives to those who make a living selling flying fox bushmeat.

In Guam and the Commonwealth of the Northern Mariana Islands, consumption of the Mariana fruit bat exposes locals to the neurotoxin beta-Methylamino-L-alanine (BMAA) which may later lead to neurodegenerative diseases. BMAA may become biomagnified in humans who consume flying foxes; flying foxes are exposed to BMAA by eating cycad fruits.

=== Medicine ===
Flying foxes are killed for use in traditional medicine. The Indian flying fox, for example, has many perceived medical uses. Some believe that its fat is a treatment for rheumatism. Tribes in the Attappadi region of India eat the cooked flesh of the Indian flying fox to treat asthma and chest pain. Healers of the Kanda tribe of Bangladesh use hair from Indian flying foxes to create treatments for "fever with shivering."

=== Transmitting disease ===
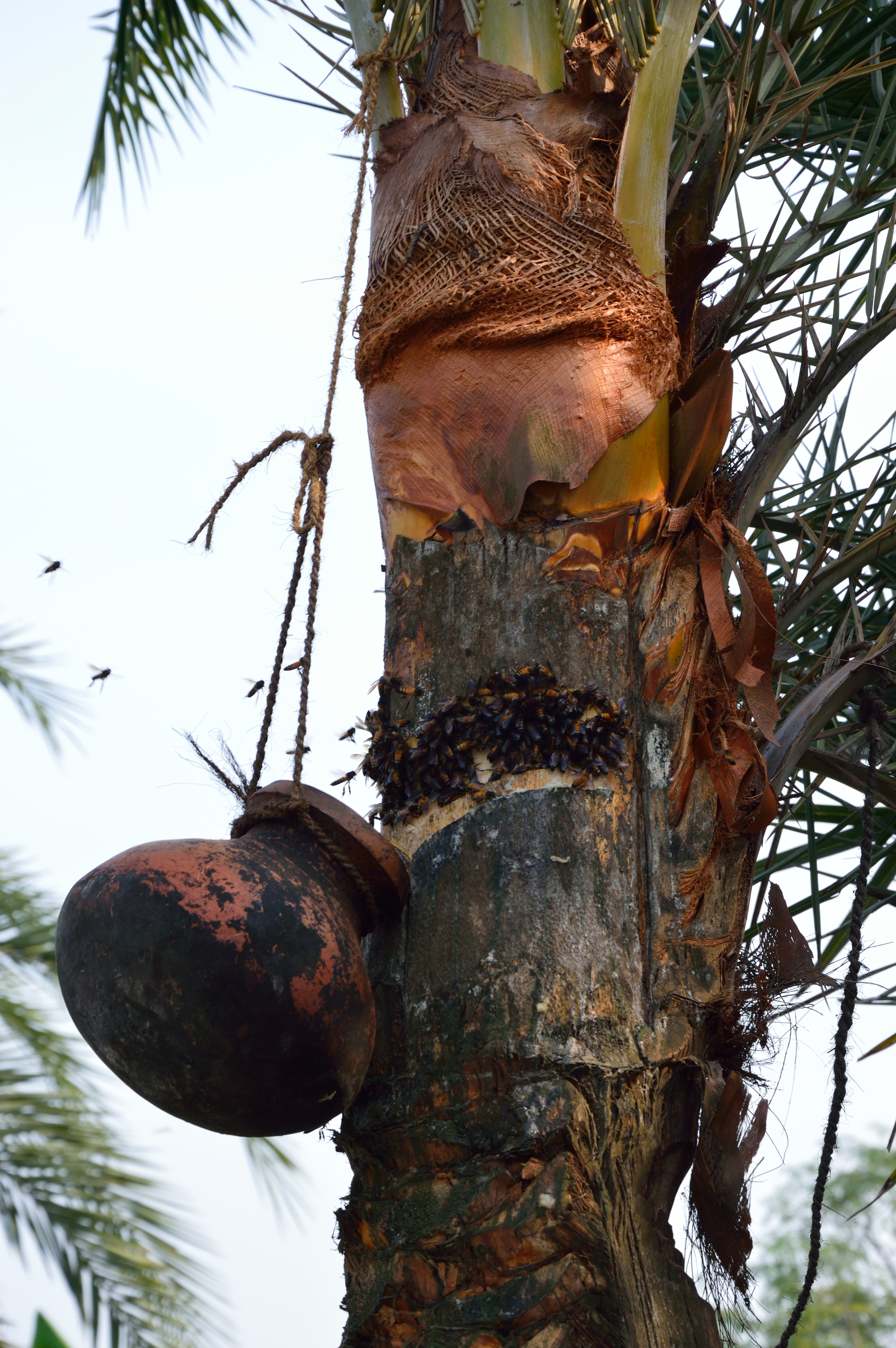
Date palm sap collection, a primary exposure route for Nipah virus

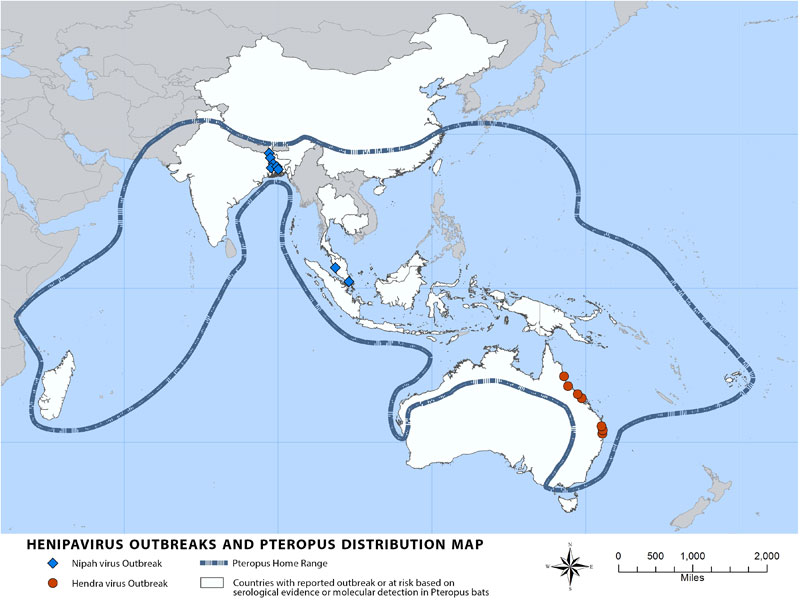
Known henipavirus outbreaks as of 2014

Flying foxes are the natural reservoirs of several viruses, some of which can be transmitted to humans. Notably, flying foxes can transmit lyssaviruses, which cause rabies. In Australia the rabies virus is not naturally present; Australian bat lyssavirus is the only lyssavirus present. Australian bat lyssavirus was first identified in 1996; it is very rarely transmitted to humans. Transmission occurs from the bite or scratch of an infected animal, but can also occur from getting the infected animal's saliva in a mucous membrane or an open wound. Exposure to flying fox blood, urine, or feces is not a risk of exposure to Australian bat lyssavirus. Since 1994, there have been three records of people getting infected with it—all three were in Queensland and each case was fatal.

Flying foxes are also reservoirs of henipaviruses such as Hendra virus and Nipah virus. Hendra virus was first identified in 1994; it also rarely occurs in humans. From 1994 to 2013, there have been seven reported cases of Hendra virus affecting people, four of which were fatal. The hypothesized primary route of human infection is via contact with horses that have come into contact with flying fox urine. There are no documented instances of direct transmission between flying foxes and humans. As of 2012, there is a vaccine available for horses to decrease the likelihood of infection and transmission.

Nipah virus was first identified in 1998 in Malaysia. Since 1998, there have been several Nipah outbreaks in Malaysia, Singapore, India, and Bangladesh, resulting in over 100 casualties. A 2018 outbreak in Kerala, India resulted in 19 humans infected, of which 17 died. The overall fatality rate is 40–75%. Humans can contract Nipah virus from direct contact with flying foxes or their fluids, through exposure to an intermediate host such as domestic pigs, or from contact with an infected person. A 2014 study of the Indian flying fox and Nipah virus found that while Nipah virus outbreaks are more likely in areas preferred by flying foxes, "the presence of bats in and of itself is not considered a risk factor for Nipah virus infection." Rather, the consumption of date palm sap is a significant route of transmission. The practice of date palm sap collection involves placing collecting pots at date palm trees. Indian flying foxes have been observed licking the sap as it flows into the pots, as well as defecating and urinating in proximity to the pots. In this way, humans who drink the palm sap can be exposed to the bats' viruses. The use of bamboo skirts on collecting pots lowers the risk of contamination from bat fluids.

Flying foxes can transmit several non-lethal diseases as well, such as Menangle virus and Nelson Bay virus. These viruses rarely affect humans and few cases have been reported. While other bat species have been suspected or implicated as the reservoir of diseases such as SARS and Ebola, flying foxes are not suspected as hosts for either causative virus.

=== Pests ===
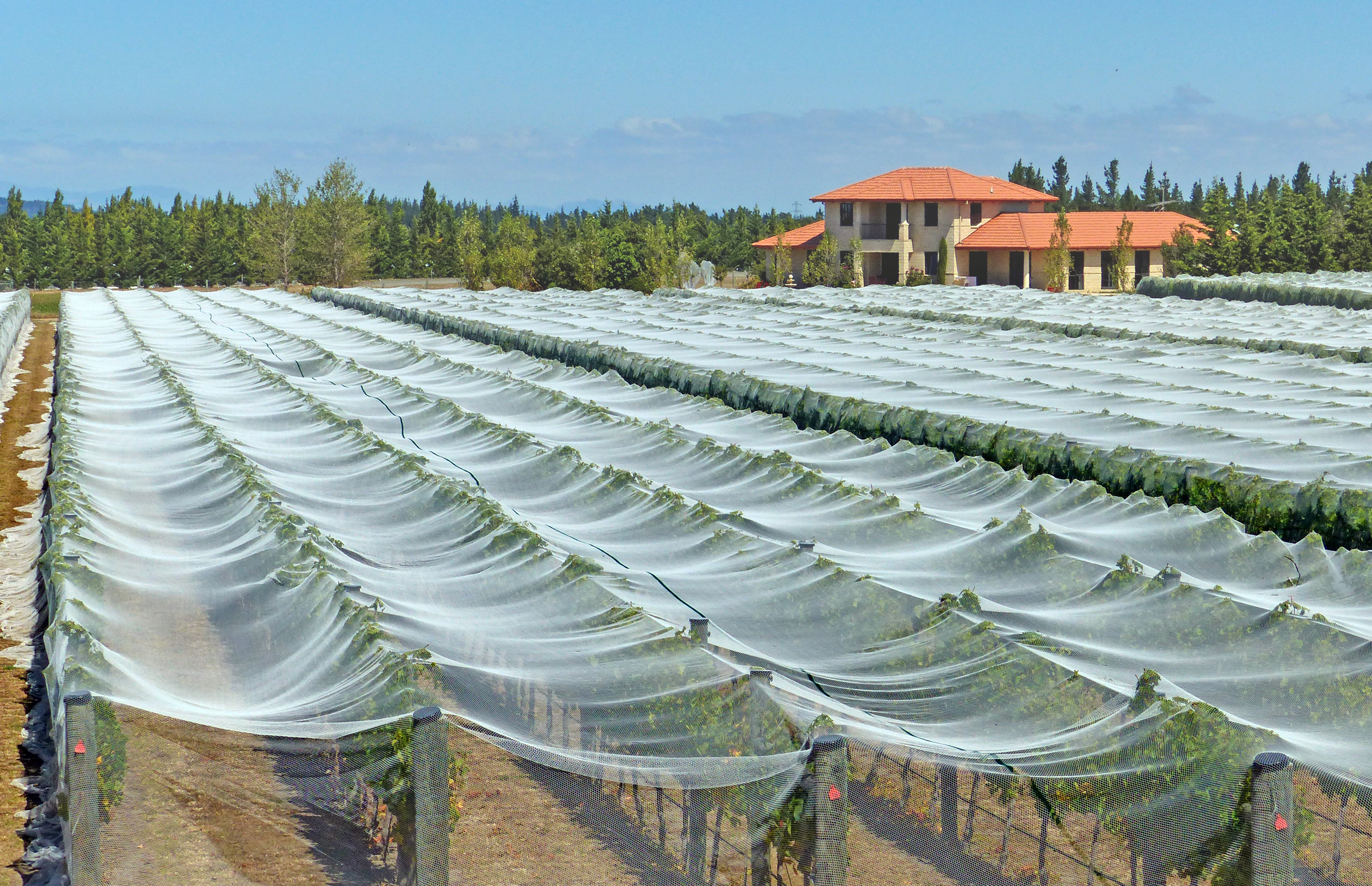
Netting used to protect crops from wildlife such as flying foxes

Flying foxes are often considered pests due to the damage they cause to orchard crops. Flying foxes have been cited as particularly destructive to almonds, guavas, and mangoes in the Maldives; lychee in Mauritius; areca in India; and stone fruits in Australia. Orchard damages from other animals are often misattributed to flying foxes, though, and economic damage can be difficult to quantify or exaggerated. To prevent fruit damage, farmers may legally or illegally cull flying foxes. In the 1800s, the Australian government paid farmers bounties to kill flying foxes, though the practice has since been discontinued. Alternatives to culling include placing barriers between the bats and fruit trees, such as netting, or harvesting fruit in a timely manner to avoid attracting as many flying foxes. Netting is the most effective way to prevent crop loss, though some farmers find it cost prohibitive. Estimates vary, but it can cost between USD$4,400 to up to USD$44,000 to net 1 ha (2.5 acres) of crops. Other methods of preventing fruit loss may also involve the use of scare guns, chemical deterrents, or night-time lights. Alternatively, planting Singapore cherry trees and other decoy crops next to an orchard can be effective, as flying foxes are much more attracted to their fruits than many other orchard crops.

The location of flying fox camps can be a disturbance to humans. In Batemans Bay, Australia, locals report being so disturbed by flying fox vocalizations in the morning that they lose sleep. Flying foxes can fly into power lines and cause electricity outages. Their guano and body odor are also unpleasant to smell. The presence of flying fox colonies can cause nearby property values to decline.

=== In culture ===
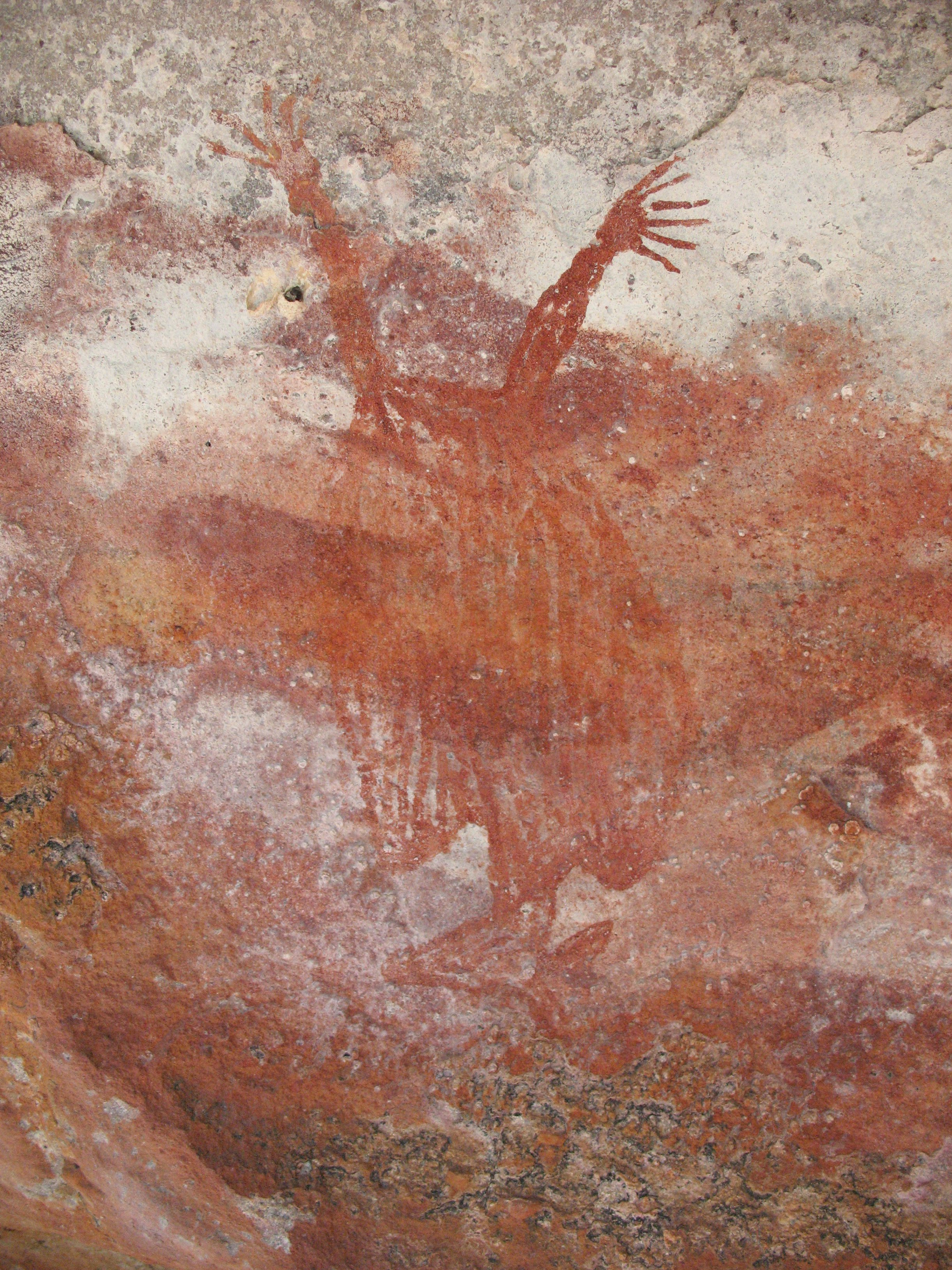
A flying fox depicted in Aboriginal art

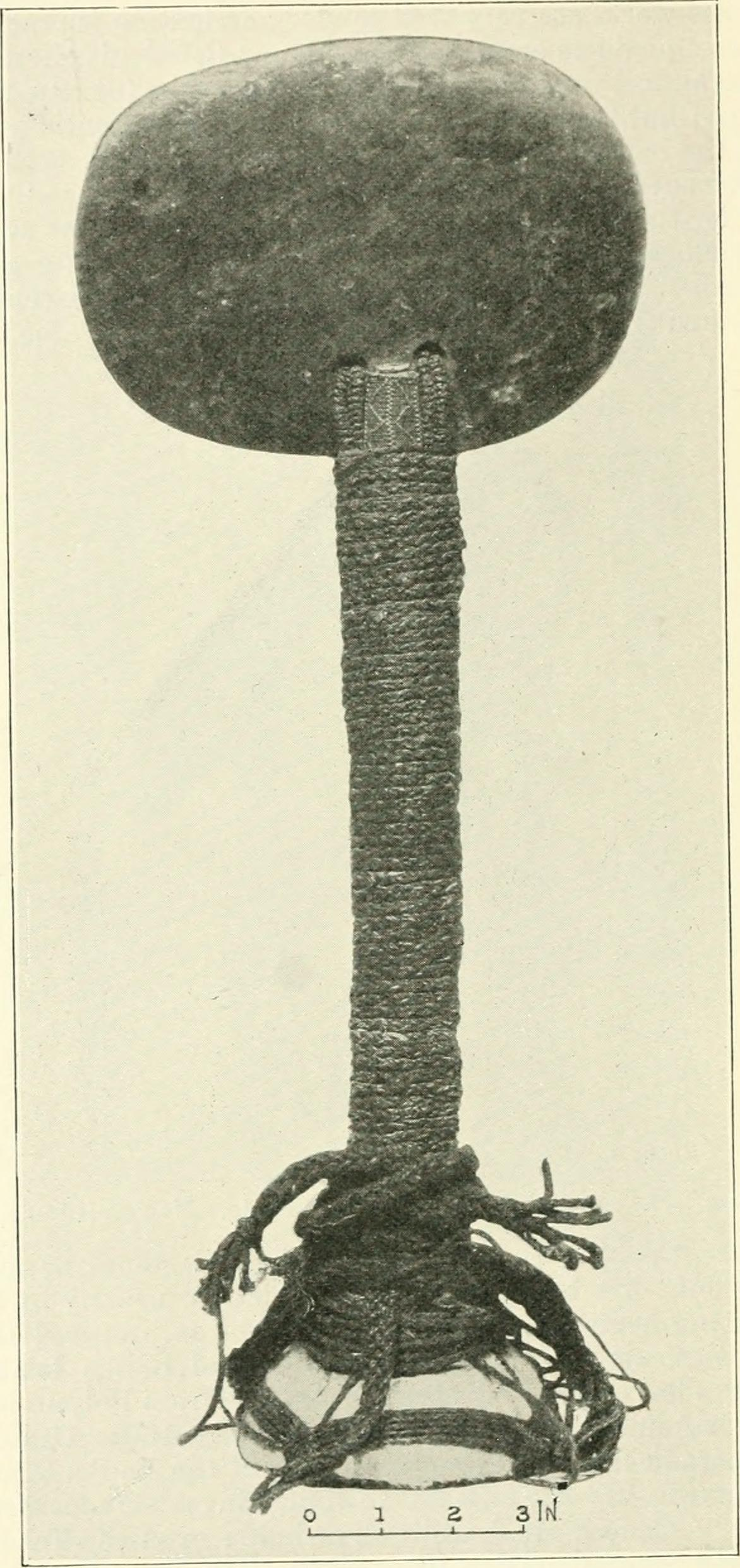
Ceremonial axe decorated with flying fox fur braid in New Caledonia

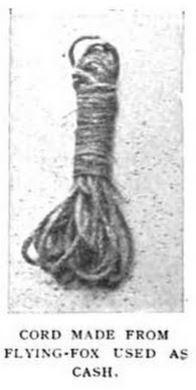
Flying fox braided fur cord used as currency in the Loyalty Islands

Flying foxes are featured in many indigenous cultures and traditions.

A folklore Dreamtime story from the New South Wales North Coast in Australia features an impatient flying fox wanting the Great Spirit to teach him how to be a bird, only to be hung upside down on a branch. They were also featured in Aboriginal cave art, as evinced by several surviving examples.

In Tonga, flying foxes are considered sacred. All flying foxes are the property of the king, meaning non-royal persons cannot harm them in any way. Tongan legend states that a colony of flying foxes at Kolovai are the descendants of a pair of flying foxes gifted to the King of Tonga by the Princess of Samoa.

In the Indian village of Puliangulam, a colony of Indian flying foxes roosts in a Banyan tree. Villagers believe that the flying foxes are under the protection of Muni, and do not harm the bats. A shrine to Muni is beneath the tree. If locals believe that they have offended Muni by failing to protect the bats, they will pray and perform puja after offering sweet rice, coconut, and bananas to those attending the ceremony.

Flying foxes are also featured in folk stories from Papua New Guinea. Stories with flying foxes include a legend about a cockatoo stealing feathers from the flying fox, resulting in it becoming nocturnal. Another story features a flying fox that could transform into a young man; the flying fox stole a woman away from her husband to take as his wife. Another legend states that a flying fox-man was responsible for introducing yams to their people.

Indigenous societies in Oceania used parts of flying foxes for functional and ceremonial weapons. In the Solomon Islands, people created barbs out of their bones for use in spears. In New Caledonia, ceremonial axes made of jade were decorated with braids of flying fox fur. Flying fox wings were depicted on the war shields of the Asmat people of Indonesia; they believed that the wings offered protection to their warriors.

There are modern and historical references to flying fox byproducts used as currency. In New Caledonia, braided flying fox fur was once used as currency. On the island of Makira, which is part of the Solomon Islands, indigenous peoples still hunt flying foxes for their teeth as well as for bushmeat. The canine teeth are strung together on necklaces that are used as currency. Teeth of the insular flying fox are particularly prized, as they are usually large enough to drill holes in. The Makira flying fox is also hunted, though, despite its smaller teeth. Deterring local peoples from using flying fox teeth as currency may be detrimental to the species, with Lavery and Fasi noting, "Species that provide an important cultural resource can be highly treasured." Emphasizing sustainable hunting of flying foxes to preserve cultural currency may be more effective than encouraging the abandonment of cultural currency. Even if flying foxes were no longer hunted for their teeth, they would still be killed for bushmeat; therefore, retaining their cultural value may encourage sustainable hunting practices. Lavery stated, "It's a positive, not a negative, that their teeth are so culturally valuable. The practice of hunting bats shouldn't necessarily be stopped, it needs to be managed sustainably."

=== Other uses ===
Flying foxes and other bat species in Southeast Asia are often killed and sold as "mummies". The mummified bodies or skeletons of these bats are often shipped to the United States where they are sold in souvenir or curiosity shops or online through vendors such as Etsy or eBay. From 2000 to 2013, over 100,000 dead bats were imported to the United States. Bat conservationist Merlin Tuttle wrote, "I've seen huge losses, mostly due to various kinds of over-harvesting, especially at cave entrances, either for food or for sale as mummies." Despite sometimes being advertised as "sustainable," the practice could lead to overharvesting and depletion of flying fox species, with Tuttle saying, "It is a virtual certainty that the bats you've seen advertised are not sustainably harvested."
