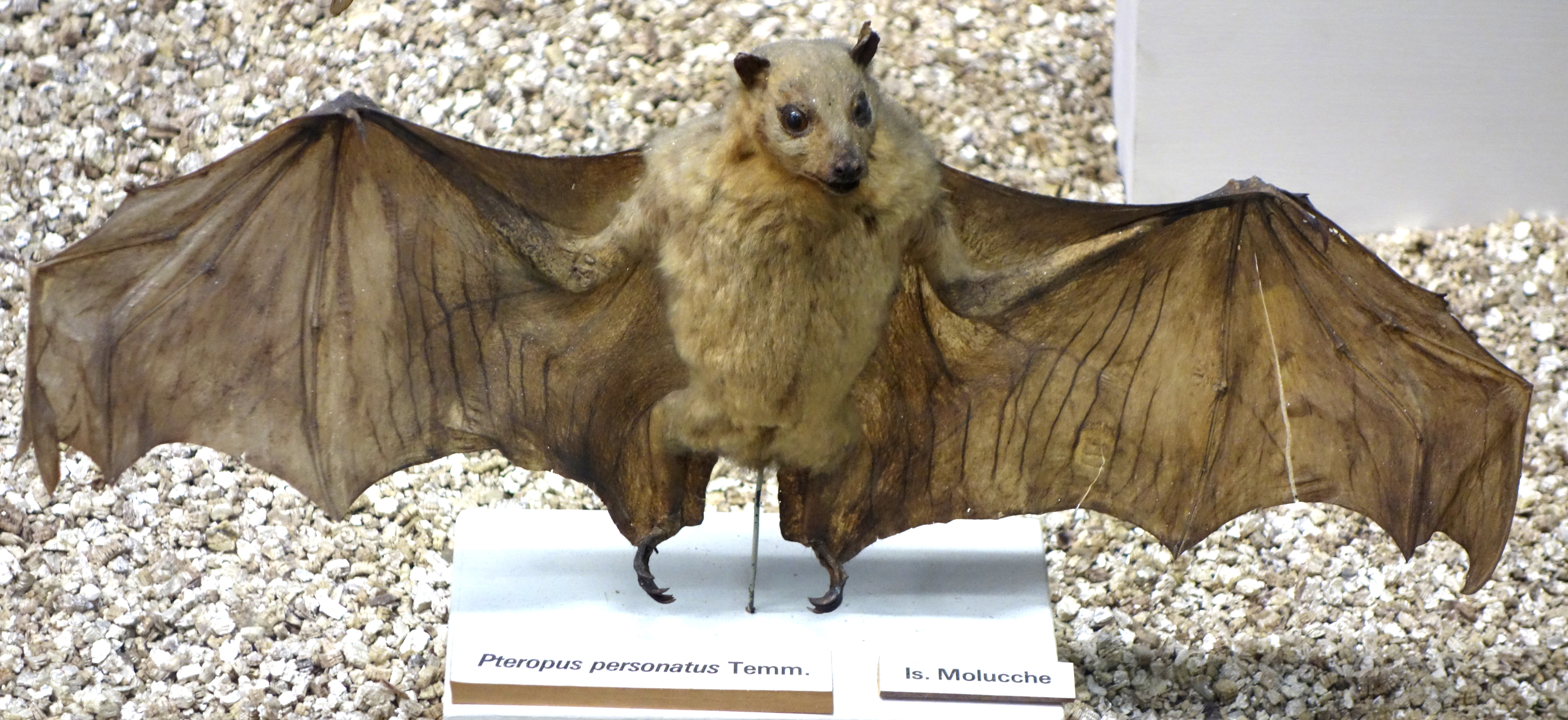

Conservation status
- Least Concern (IUCN 3.1)

Scientific classification
- Kingdom: Animalia
- Phylum: Chordata
- Class: Mammalia
- Order: Chiroptera
- Family: Pteropodidae
- Genus: Pteropus
- Species: P. personatus

Binomial name
- Pteropus personatus Temminck, 1825
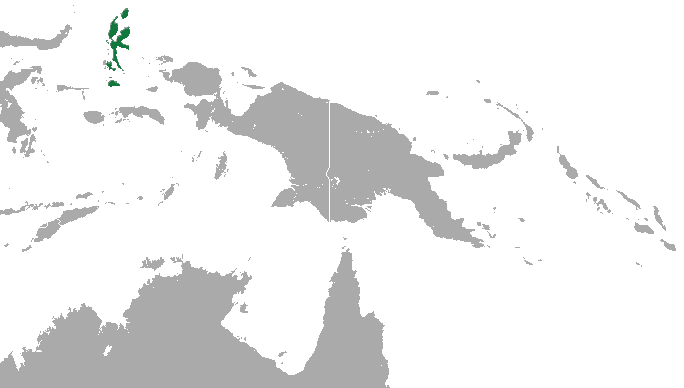
- Masked flying fox range

= Masked flying fox =

Species of bat

The masked flying fox, Moluccan masked flying fox or masked fruit bat (Pteropus personatus), is a species of flying fox in the family Pteropodidae. It is endemic to Indonesia. It is part of a species complex of closely related species. The species is hunted.

== Distribution and habitat ==
The masked flying fox is native to the North Molluca Islands in Indonesia.
