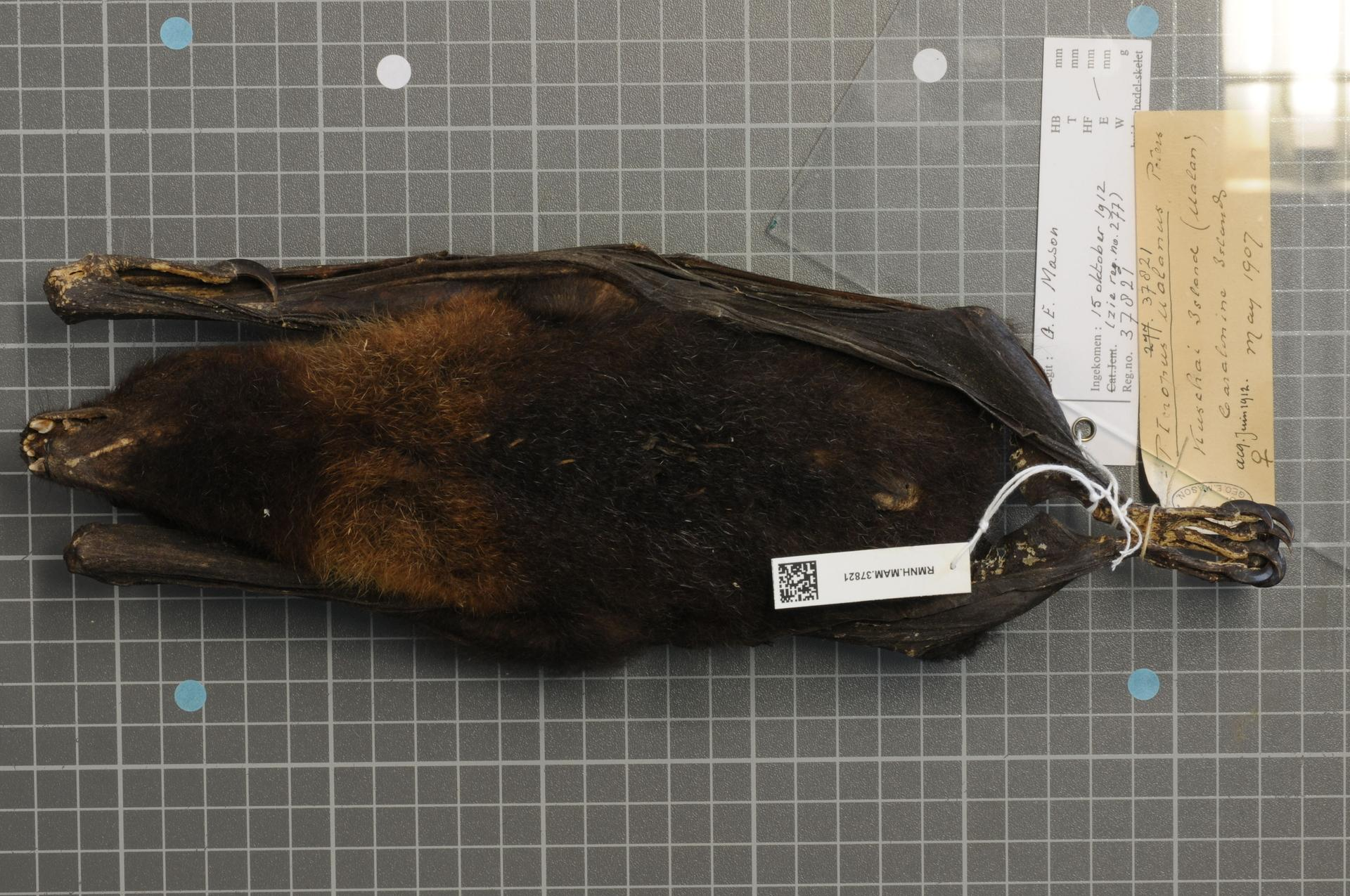

Conservation status
- Endangered (IUCN 3.1)
- CITES Appendix I

Scientific classification
- Kingdom: Animalia
- Phylum: Chordata
- Class: Mammalia
- Order: Chiroptera
- Family: Pteropodidae
- Genus: Pteropus
- Species: P. ualanus

Binomial name
- Pteropus ualanus Peters, 1883
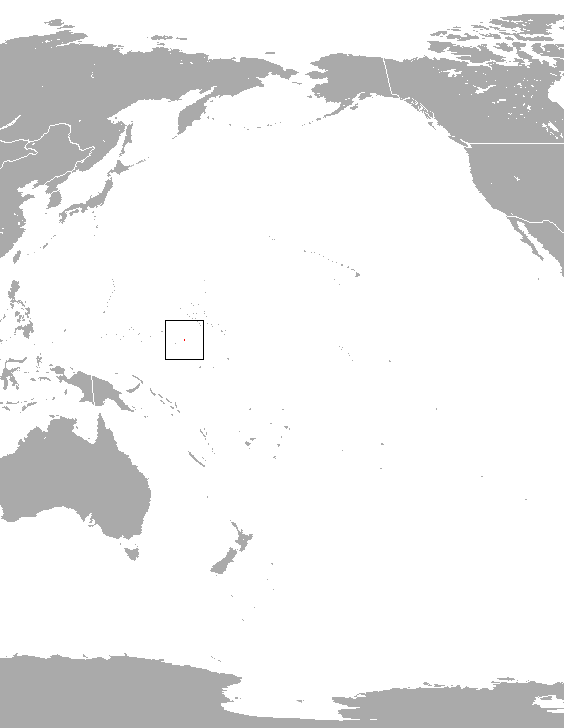
- Kosrae flying fox range

= Kosrae flying fox =

Species of bat

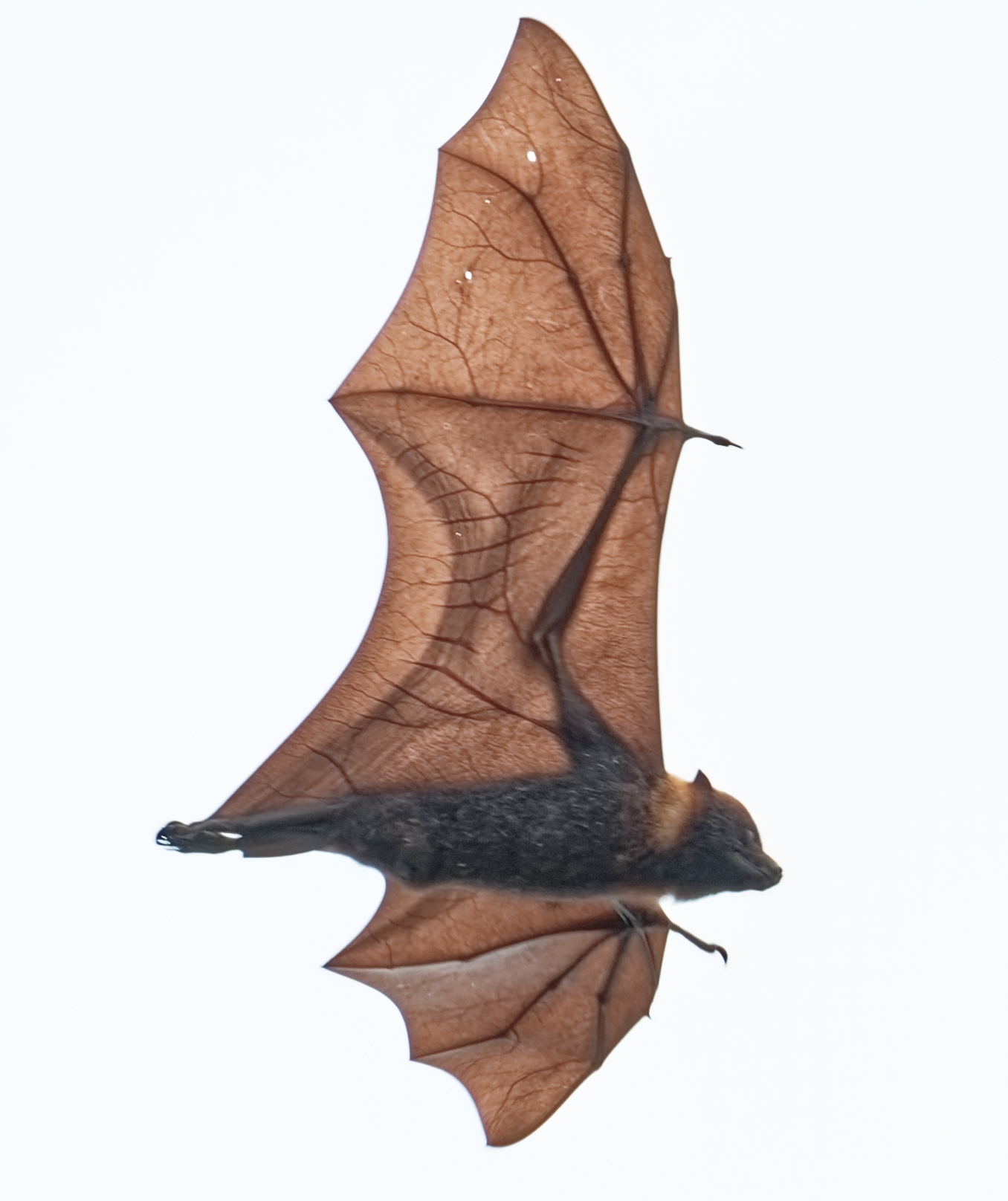
Kosrae flying fox in flight.

The Kosrae flying fox (Pteropus ualanus) is a species of megabat in the genus Pteropus found on the island of Kosrae, Micronesia.

The Kosrae flying fox (Pteropus ualanus) has recovered to 2,000–3,000 bats but faces ongoing threats.

== Etymology ==
Pteropus ualanus was first documented in 1824 by French biologist René Primevère Lesson. Lesson first identified Pteropus ualanus as Pteropus karaudren; however, P. karaudren was later recognized as a synonym for P. mariannus. The first specimen was collected in 1827 by Russian biologist Heinrich von Kittlitz. The first specimen was collected in 1827 by Russian biologist Heinrich von Kittlitz.

== Conservation ==
Pteropus ualanus is vulnerable to population bottlenecks because of their geographic location. In 1926, P. ualanus nearly went extinct due to a population bottleneck caused by an unknown disease.
