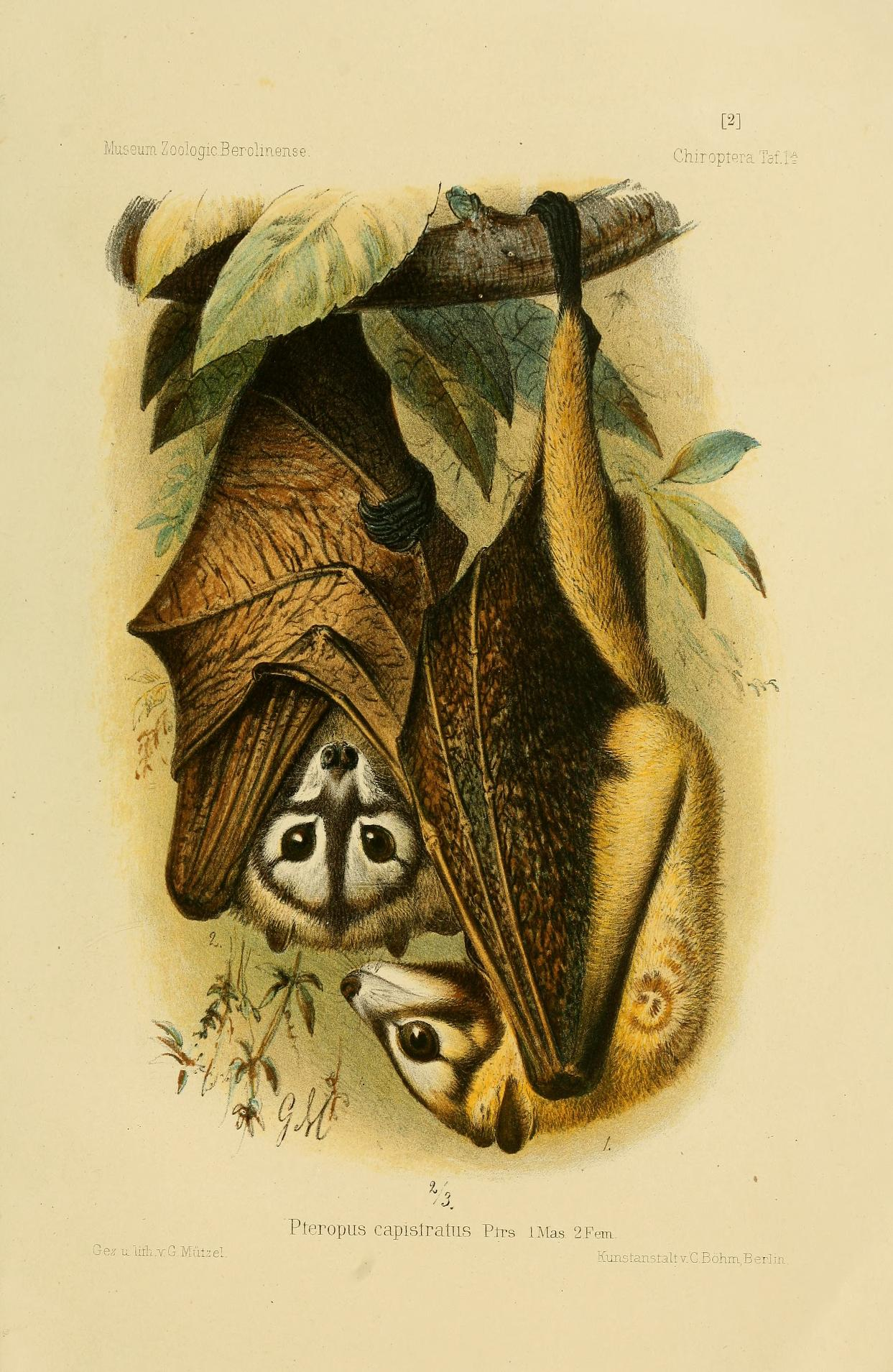

Conservation status
- Vulnerable (IUCN 3.1)

Scientific classification
- Kingdom: Animalia
- Phylum: Chordata
- Class: Mammalia
- Order: Chiroptera
- Family: Pteropodidae
- Genus: Pteropus
- Species: P. capistratus

Binomial name
- Pteropus capistratus Peters, 1867
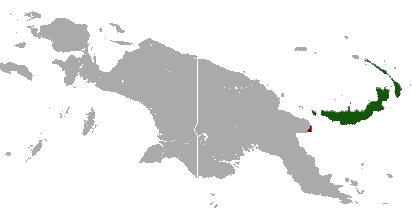
- Bismarck masked flying fox range (green — native, brown — vagrant)

Synonyms
- Pteropus temminckii capistratus (Peters, 1867)

= Bismarck masked flying fox =

Species of bat

The Bismarck masked flying fox (Pteropus capistratus) is a species of flying fox in the family Pteropodidae found in Papua New Guinea and named after the Bismarck Archipelago. It was once considered a subspecies of Pteropus temminckii before being reassessed in 2001. This species has two subspecies, P. c. capistratus and P. c. ennisae. The IUCN classified it as Near Threatened in 2009, noting that the rate of decline is almost high enough to reclassify the species as Vulnerable.

== Taxonomy ==
The Bismarck masked flying fox was described as a new species in 1867 by German naturalist Wilhelm Peters. Prior to 1995, the Bismarck masked flying fox was largely considered a subspecies of the Temminck's flying fox (Pteropus temminckii).

== Description ==
Its forearm length is 109–118 mm (4.3–4.6 in).

== Biology and ecology ==
It is one of the rare species of mammals in which the males can lactate. It is generally solitary, though males and females may roost together in pairs.

== Range and habitat ==
The Bismarck masked flying fox is endemic to Papua New Guinea where it has been documented at a range of elevations from 0–1,200 m (0–3,937 ft) above sea level.

== Conservation ==
As of 2021, it is evaluated as a vulnerable species by the IUCN. It meets the criteria for this designation because it has a small population size, likely numbering fewer than 10,000 mature individuals. It is experiencing significant habitat loss and population decline.
