= Gilliard's flying fox =

Conservation status
- Vulnerable (IUCN 3.1)

Scientific classification
- Kingdom: Animalia
- Phylum: Chordata
- Class: Mammalia
- Order: Chiroptera
- Family: Pteropodidae
- Genus: Pteropus
- Species: P. gilliardi

Binomial name
- Pteropus gilliardi Van Deusen, 1969
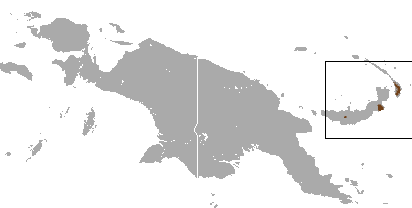
- Gilliard's flying fox range

Species of bat

Gilliard's flying fox (Pteropus gilliardi) is a species of flying fox in the family Pteropodidae. It is endemic to Papua New Guinea. It is known from only three specimens.

== Biology ==
Their natural habitats are subtropical or tropical dry forests and subtropical or tropical swamps. They prefer to stay solitary or in small groups. They live in a restricted range, and widespread clearing of lowland forests could affect upland habitats.
