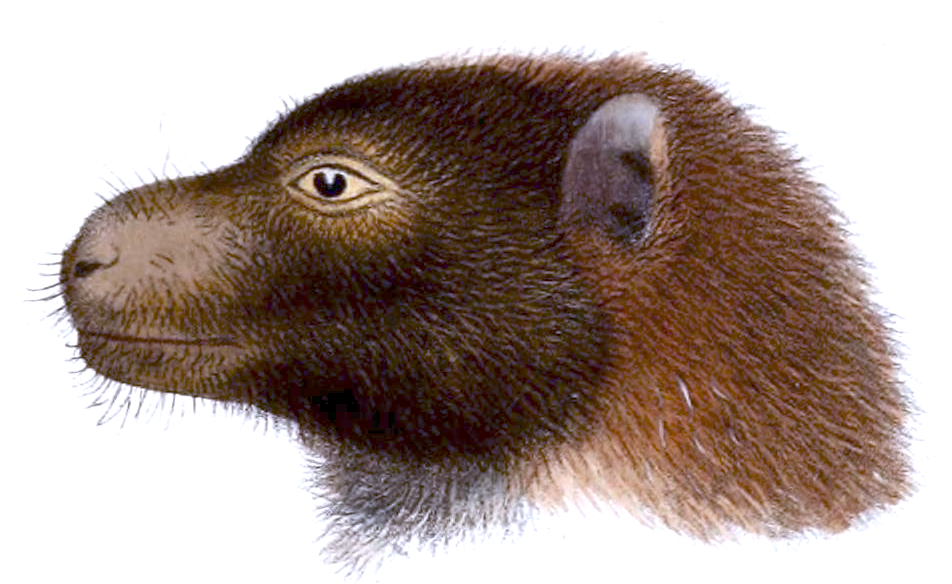

Conservation status
- Least Concern (IUCN 3.1)

Scientific classification
- Kingdom: Animalia
- Phylum: Chordata
- Class: Mammalia
- Order: Chiroptera
- Family: Pteropodidae
- Genus: Pteropus
- Species: P. woodfordi

Binomial name
- Pteropus woodfordi Thomas, 1888
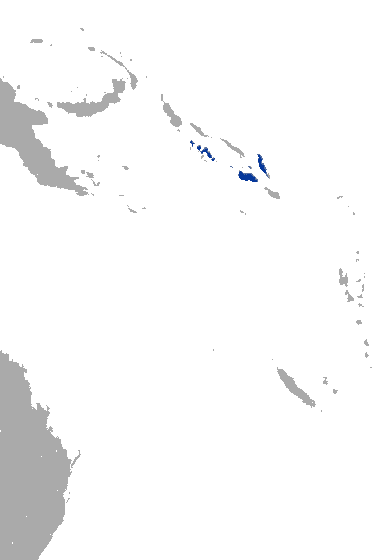
- Dwarf flying fox range

= Dwarf flying fox =

Species of bat

The dwarf flying fox, least flying fox, or least fruit bat (Pteropus woodfordi) is a species of flying fox in the family Pteropodidae. It is endemic to the Solomon Islands. It is threatened by deforestation, which is believed to damage roosting sites in old growth forests.
