= Solomons flying fox =

Conservation status
- Near Threatened (IUCN 3.1)

Scientific classification
- Kingdom: Animalia
- Phylum: Chordata
- Class: Mammalia
- Order: Chiroptera
- Family: Pteropodidae
- Genus: Pteropus
- Species: P. rayneri

Binomial name
- Pteropus rayneri Gray, 1870
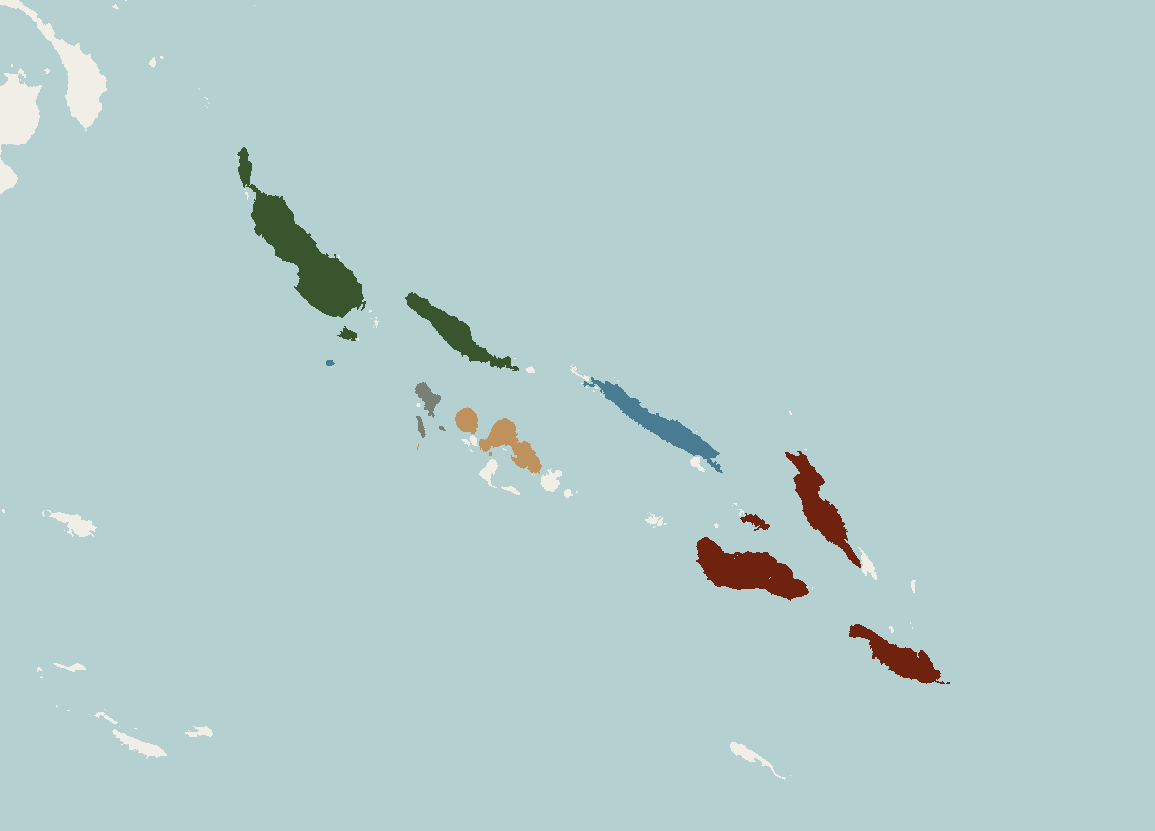
- Solomons flying fox range P. r. rayneri P. r. grandis P. r. rubianus P. r. monoensis P. r. lavellanus

Species of bat

The Solomons flying fox (Pteropus rayneri) is a species of flying fox in the family Pteropodidae. It is endemic to the Solomon Islands archipelago. The population abundance has been marked by periodic die-offs of generally unknown cause, including a major die-off in the 1980s. Hunting may be a significant threat to the population.
