= Mataragka =

Mataragka or Mataranga (Greek: Ματαράγκα; Albanian: Matrënga) may refer to:

== Places in Greece ==
- Mataragka, Achaea, a village in the municipal unit Larissos, Achaea
- Mataragka, Aetolia-Acarnania, a village in Aetolia-Acarnania, Greece
- Mataragka, Karditsa, the seat of the former municipality Arni, Greece

== Albania ==
- Mataranga family, an Albanian noble family
  - Principality of Mataranga, a short-lived Albanian principality

== See also ==
- Mataranga family
- Mataranka (disambiguation)
