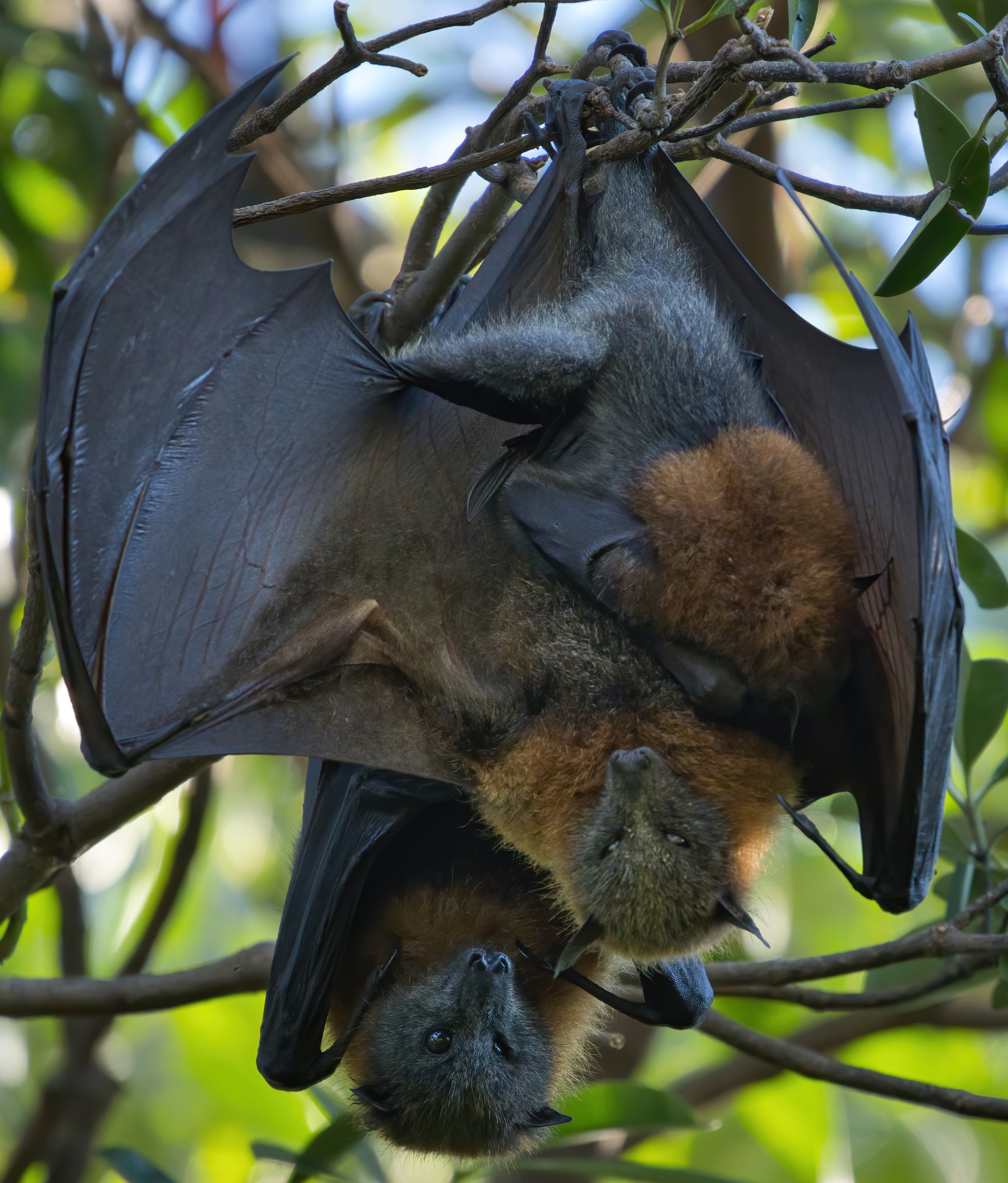

Conservation status
- Vulnerable (IUCN 3.1)

Scientific classification
- Kingdom: Animalia
- Phylum: Chordata
- Class: Mammalia
- Order: Chiroptera
- Family: Pteropodidae
- Genus: Pteropus
- Species: P. poliocephalus

Binomial name
- Pteropus poliocephalus Temminck, 1825.

= Grey-headed flying fox =

Species of bat

The grey-headed flying fox (Pteropus poliocephalus) is a megabat native to Australia. The species shares mainland Australia with three other members of the genus Pteropus: the little red P. scapulatus, spectacled P. conspicillatus, and the black P. alecto. The grey-headed flying fox is the largest bat in Australia.

The grey-headed flying fox is endemic to the south-eastern forested areas of Australia, principally east of the Great Dividing Range. Its range extends approximately from Bundaberg in Queensland to Geelong in Victoria, with outlying colonies in Ingham and Finch Hatton in the north, and in Adelaide in the south. In the southern parts of its range it occupies more extreme latitudes than any other Pteropus species.

As of 2021, the species is listed as "vulnerable" on the IUCN Red List of Threatened Species and Australian Government's Environment Protection and Biodiversity Conservation Act threatened species list.

== Taxonomy ==
A description of the species was published by Coenraad Temminck in his 1825 monograph of mammals. Hybridisation with the species Pteropus alecto has been noted where their ranges intersect.

The common names for Pteropus poliocephalus include grey-headed kalong. The entry in Gould's Mammals of Australia (1863) gave the bat the title grey-headed vampire.

== Description ==
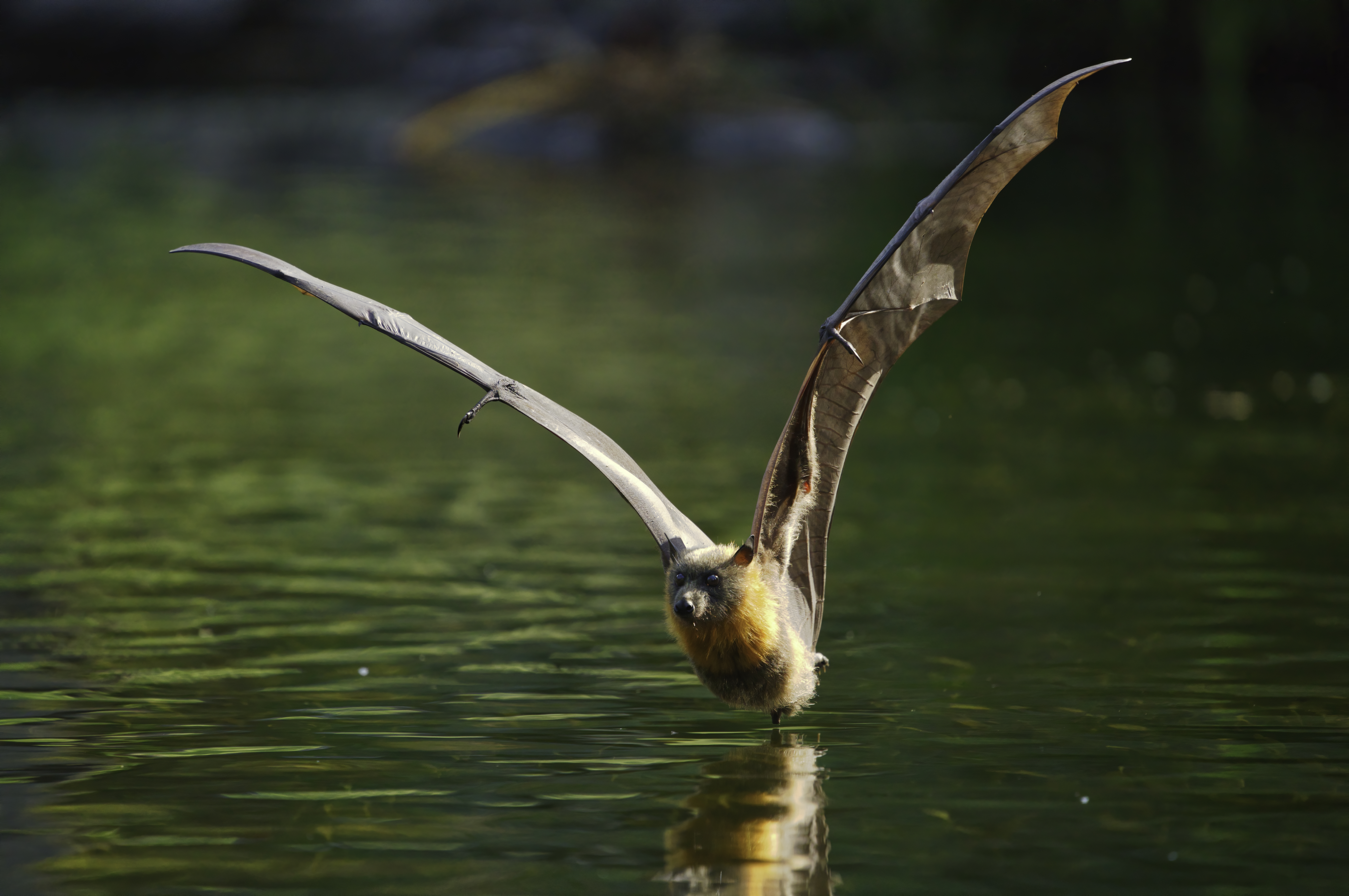
Wingspan is visible as this flying fox skims water to drink.

The grey-headed flying fox is the largest bat in Australia, with the adult wingspan reaching up to 1 m (3 ft 3 in) in length and weighing up to 1 kg (2.2 lb). Weight generally varies between 600 and 1,000 g (21 and 35 oz), with an average of 700 g (25 oz). The combined length of the head and body is from 230 to 290 mm. The forearm length is a range from 138 to 180 mm. The length of the ear from the tip to base is 30 to 37 mm.

The overall colour of the pelage is a dark-grey body with a light-grey head, separated by a reddish-brown collar. The fur on the body is long and streaked with grey, the broad and well defined collar completely encircles the neck with hair that is golden orange in tone. A unique characteristic among bats of the genus Pteropus is fur on the legs that extends all the way to the ankle.

Like many megachiropterans, the species lacks a tail. All of these bats possess claws on its first and second digits. The head is simple in form, with the characteristic 'dog-like' appearance of the genus. Since it does not echolocate, it lacks the tragus or leaf ornamentation found in many species of Microchiroptera. It relies on smell and, predominately, sight to locate its food (nectar, pollen and native fruits) and thus has relatively large eyes for a bat.

The voice of P. poliocephalus consists of a complex series of squeals and screechings. They will flap their wings in hot weather, using blood pumped through the patagium to cool the body temperature.

The grey-headed flying fox is long-lived for a mammal of its size. One study found that in the wild individuals live on average 7.1 years and can live as long as 18 years. In captivity, one specimen has been observed living 23 years.

Grey-headed flying foxes have been found to experience torpor.

== Ecology ==
=== Distribution ===
The distribution range is at the eastern regions of the Australian continent, mostly within 200 kilometres of the coast, from Gladstone in Queensland through to the southern Gippsland region and populations around the city of Melbourne. The breeding range has been recorded as progressing southward, the temperate climate of Melbourne and Geelong and no further north than Maryborough, Queensland.

Urbanisation may displace the species, or provide habitat that accommodates their feeding or roosting preferences. The city of Brisbane has many roosts occupied by the species; a famous colony at the Indooroopilly Island is noted for the evening departure of the bats across the local river. Within the central business district of Sydney, they can be seen travelling along city streets to feed at Moreton Bay fig trees at Hyde Park. The species was recorded as an occasional visitor to the national capital Canberra, although the flowering eucalypts at Commonwealth Park have seen more permanent camps established close to the city.

The species was surveyed during the 1920s by Francis Ratcliffe, who recorded the populations in estimates of quarter, half, or one million in camps, generally located around 40 kilometres apart. These numbers have greatly declined since this first survey.

=== Habitat and movements ===
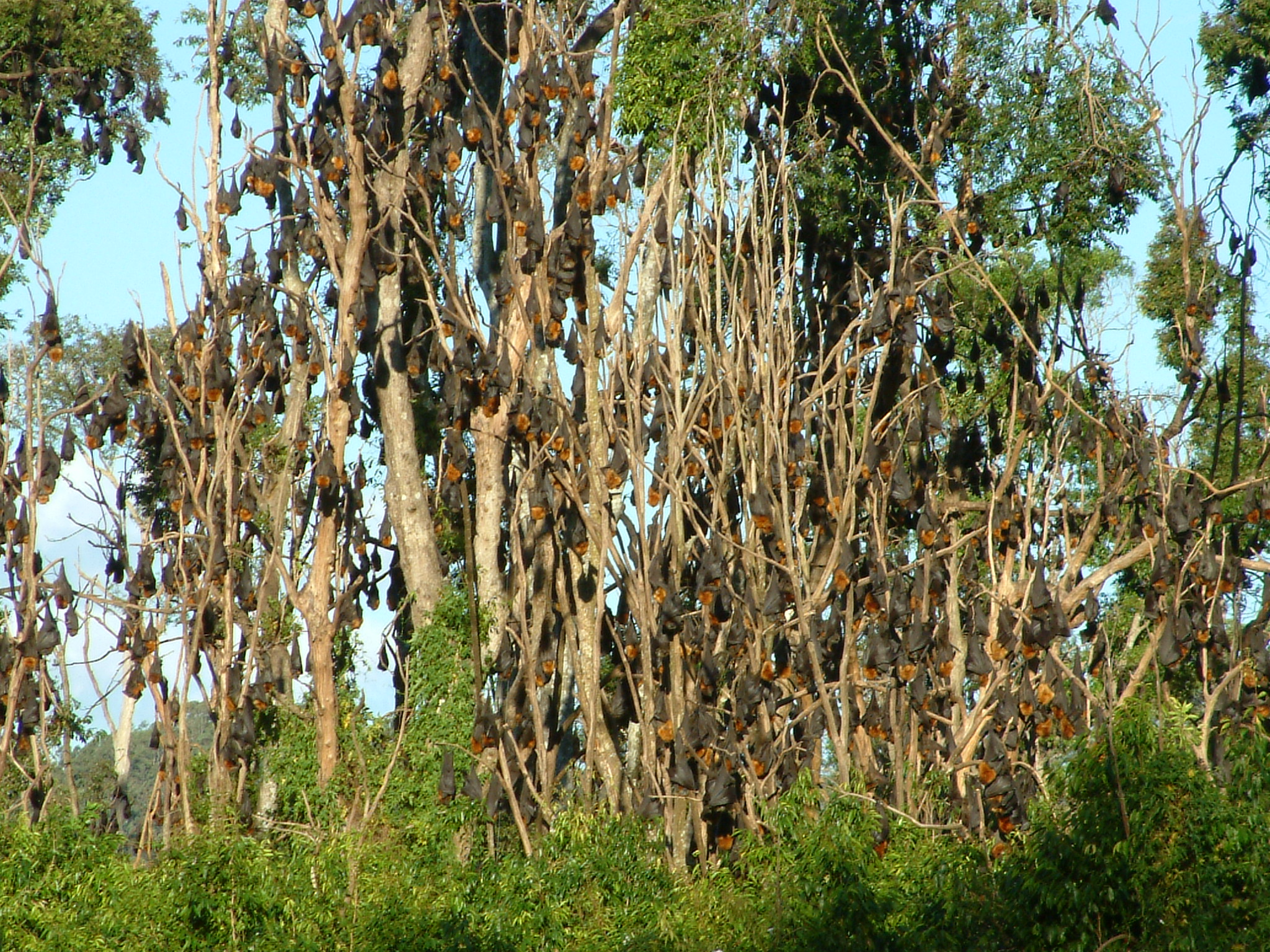
Grey-headed flying fox colony

Grey-headed flying foxes live in a variety of habitats, including rainforests, woodlands, and swamps. These camps are variable in size and are seasonally relocated; the warmer parts of the year find them occupying cool and wet gullies in large groups. During the day, individuals reside in large roosts (colonies or 'camps') consisting of hundreds to tens of thousands of individuals. Colonies are formed in seemingly arbitrary locations. Roost vegetation includes rainforest patches, stands of melaleuca, mangroves, and riparian vegetation, but roosts also occupy highly modified vegetation in urban areas. A prominent example existed for many years at the Royal Botanic Gardens in Sydney. However, the botanic gardens instituted a controversial policy to remove them from the garden grounds. The camp is now dispersed across Queensland.

Movements of grey-headed flying foxes are influenced by the availability of food. Their population is very fluid, as they move in response to the irregular blossoming of certain plant species. They are keystone pollinators and seed dispersers of over 100 species of native trees and plants. The grey-headed flying fox is a partial migrant that uses winds to facilitate long-distance movement. It does not migrate in a constant direction, but rather in the direction that will be the most beneficial at the time.

Although recorded in small numbers sporadically throughout the 20th century, it was not until the 1980s that grey-headed flying foxes routinely visited Melbourne, with a permanent camp since the 1990s. Their residence at the Royal Botanic Gardens Victoria was the subject of controversy, and the bats were eventually discouraged and moved to Yarra Bend at the city's river. The camp at this site was decimated during a heat wave, requiring its rehabilitation to sustain the relocated population. The forced relocations are also said to have led to the discovery of the orchards of the Goulburn Valley. Similarly, the first recorded permanent camp in Adelaide was established in 2010. The spread is likely due to global warming, habitat loss and drought; while the location of the new camps appears to be in response to urbanisation: a reliable food supply (such as native eucalypt plantings and backyard fruit trees) and warmer temperatures due to climate change and urban heat islands.

As of 2024, the bats have been spreading westward, with camps spotted in Port Augusta, on the Eyre Peninsula.

=== Diet and foraging ===
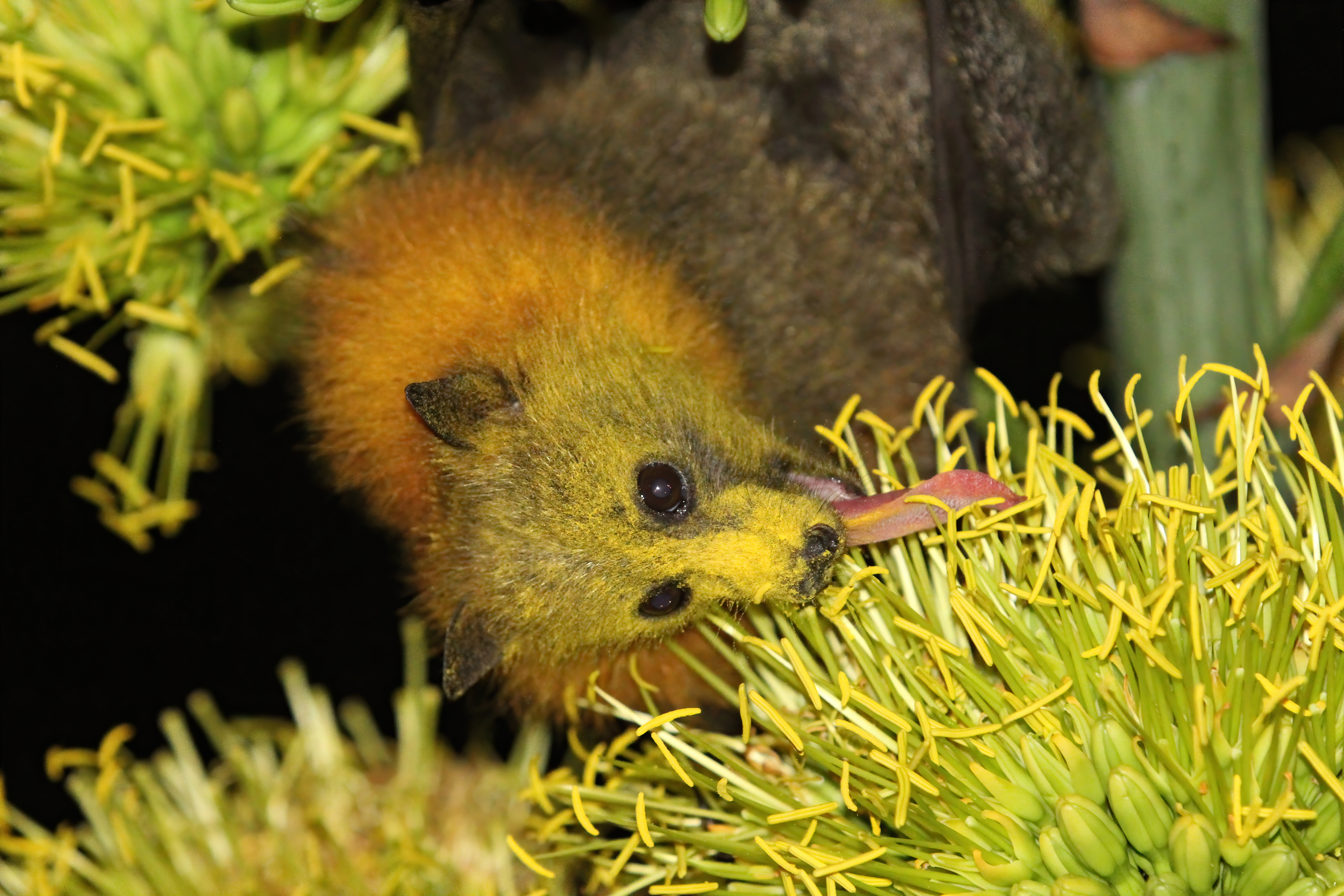
Feeding on plant nectar.

Around dusk, grey-headed flying foxes leave the roost and travel up to 50 km a night to feed on pollen, nectar and fruit. The species consumes fruit flowers and pollens of around 187 plant species. These include eucalypt, particularly Corymbia gummifera, Eucalyptus muelleriana, E. globoidea and E. botryoides, and fruits from a wide range of rainforest trees, including members of the genus Ficus. These bats are considered sequential specialists, since they feed on a variety of foods. Grey-headed flying foxes, along with the three other Australian flying fox species, fulfill a very important ecological role by dispersing the pollen and seeds of a wide range of native Australian plants. The grey-headed flying fox is the only mammalian nectarivore and frugivore to occupy substantial areas of subtropical rainforests, so is of key importance to those forests.

The teeth, tongue and palate of the pteropodid bats are able to extract plant juices from food, only swallowing smaller seeds of the meal. Incisors hold items such as fruit, and the fibrous material is ejected from the mouth after it is masticated and the juice is swallowed; larger seeds may be held in the mouth and dispersed several kilometres from the tree. The need for the elaborate intestinal tract of most herbivores is consequently removed. Some fruiting plants produce food for flying-foxes, and P. poliocephalus is attracted to the scent of their flowers and fruit and is able to locate the pale colour that indicates the source; the fruit and blooms of species that attract birds in the daylight are usually contrasting reds and purples. The food source is also presented away from the foliage that may obstruct the bat's access.

Most of the trees on which this species forages produce nectar and pollen seasonally and are abundant unpredictably, so the flying fox's migration traits cope with this. The time when flying foxes leave their roosts to feed depends on foraging light and predation risk. Flying foxes have more time and light when foraging if they leave their roosts early in the day. The entire colony may leave later if a predatory bird is present, while lactating females leave earlier. With males, the bachelors leave earlier than harem-holding males, which guard and wait until all their females have left. The flying foxes that leave the roost earlier are more vulnerable to predation, and some flying foxes will wait for others to leave, a phenomenon labelled the "after you" effect.

=== Social organisation ===
==== Groupings and territories ====
Grey-headed flying foxes form two different roosting camps, summer camps and winter camps. Summer camps are used from September to April or June. In these camps, they establish territories, mate, and reproduce. Winter camps are used from April to September. The sexes are separated in winter camps and most behaviour is characterised by mutual grooming. Summer camps are considered "main camps", while winter camps are referred to as "transit camps".

In their summer camps, starting in January, male grey-headed flying foxes set up mating territories. Mating territories are generally 3.5 body lengths along branches. These flying foxes' neck glands enlarge in males in the mating season, and are used to mark the territories. The males fight to maintain their territories, and this is associated with a steep drop in the males' body condition during this time. Around the beginning of the mating season, adult females move from the periphery towards the central male territories where they become part of short-term 'harems' that consist of a male and an unstable group of up to five females. Centrally located males are polygamous, while males on the periphery are monogamous or single. The mating system of the grey-headed flying fox is best described as a lek because males do not provide any essential resources to females and are chosen on the basis of their physical location within the roost, which correlates with male quality.

==== Reproduction ====
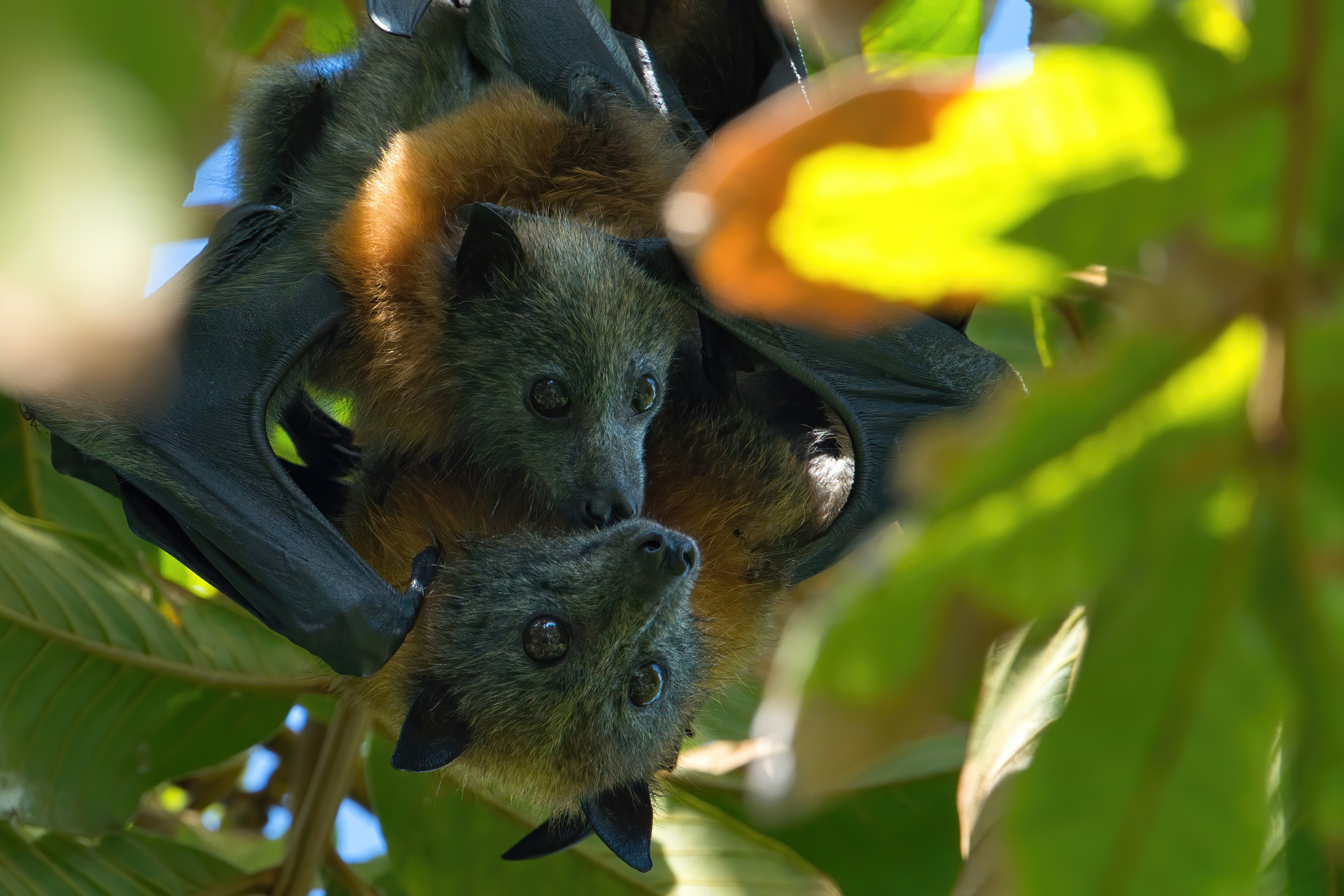
Mother with near-mature pup

Matings are generally observed between March and May, but the most likely time of conception is April. Most mating takes place in the territories and during the day. Females have control over the copulation process, and males may have to keep mating with the same females. Females usually give birth to one young each year. Gestation lasts around 27 weeks, and pregnant females give birth between late September and November. Late births into January are sometimes observed. The altricial newborns rely on their mothers for warmth. For their first three weeks, young cling to their mothers when they go foraging. After this, the young remain in the roosts. By January, young are capable of sustained flight, and by February, March or April are fully weaned.

=== Predation ===
Flying foxes are preyed on by eagles, goannas and snakes.

The camps of P. poliocephalus attract a number of larger predators. including both terrestrial and aerial hunters. The sea eagle Haliaeetus leucogaster will capture these bats in flight as they leave their roosts. The snake species Morelia spilota is frequently found as a resident at these camps, lazily selecting an individual from the apparently unconcerned group at a branch. The bat is seized in the jaws and encircled by the python's body, then swallowed head first to be digested over the next week. The species was reported by John Gould as being eaten by Indigenous Australians.

=== Zoonotic diseases ===
Negative public perception of the species has intensified with the discovery of three zoonotic viruses that are potentially fatal to humans: Hendra virus, Australian bat lyssavirus and Menangle virus. However, only Australian bat lyssavirus is known from two isolated cases to be directly transmissible from bats to humans. No person has ever died from ABLV (Lyssavirus) after having had the ABLV post-exposure vaccine..

== Conservation ==
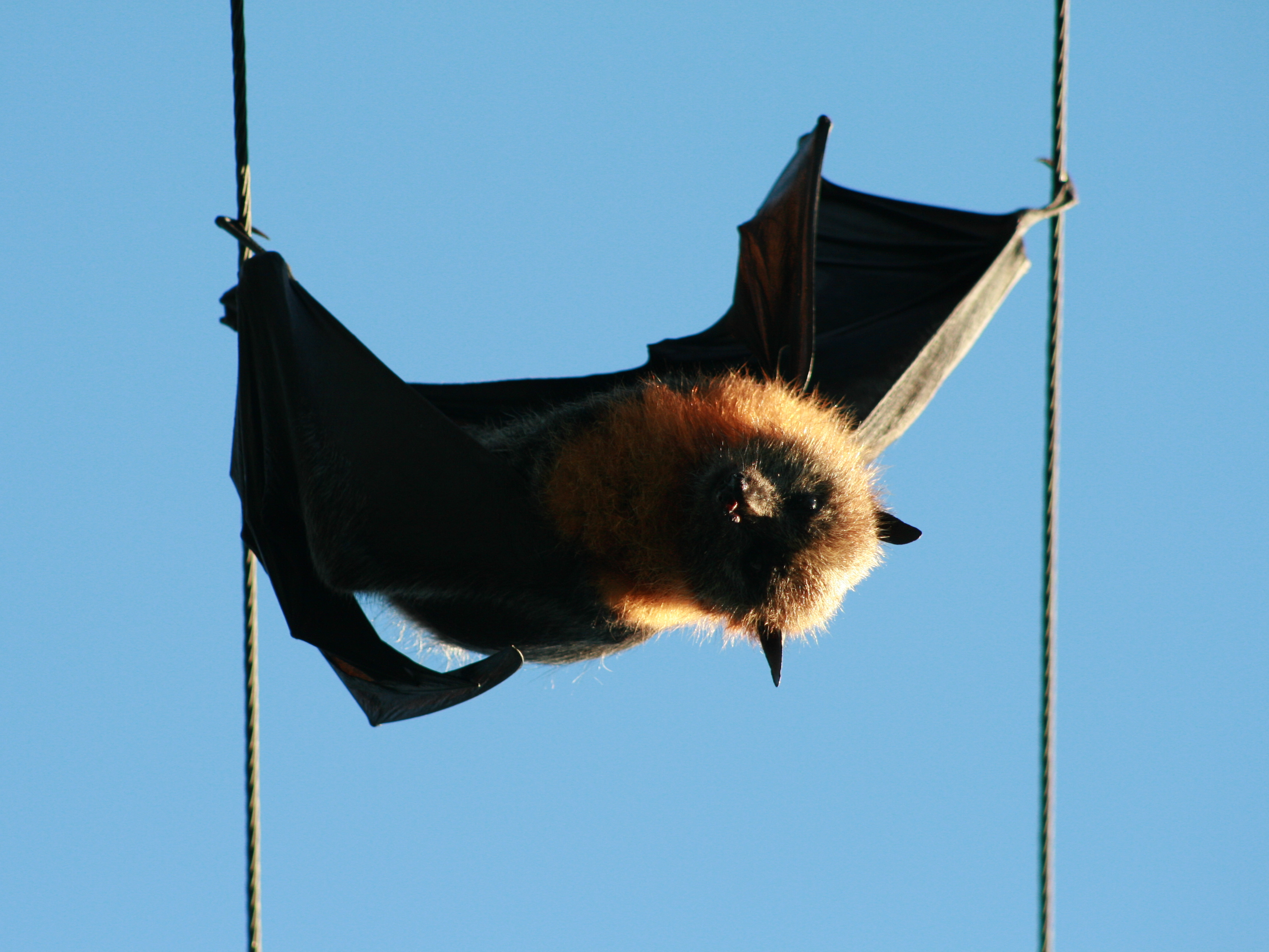
A grey-headed flying fox electrocuted between electricity transmission lines in suburban Sydney

The grey-headed flying fox is now a prominent federal conservation problem in Australia. Early in the last century, the species was considered abundant, with numbers estimated in the many millions. In recent years, though, evidence has been accumulating that the species is in serious decline. An estimate for the species in 2019 put the number at 586,000 and the national population may have declined by over 30% between 1989 and 1999 alone.

=== Threats ===
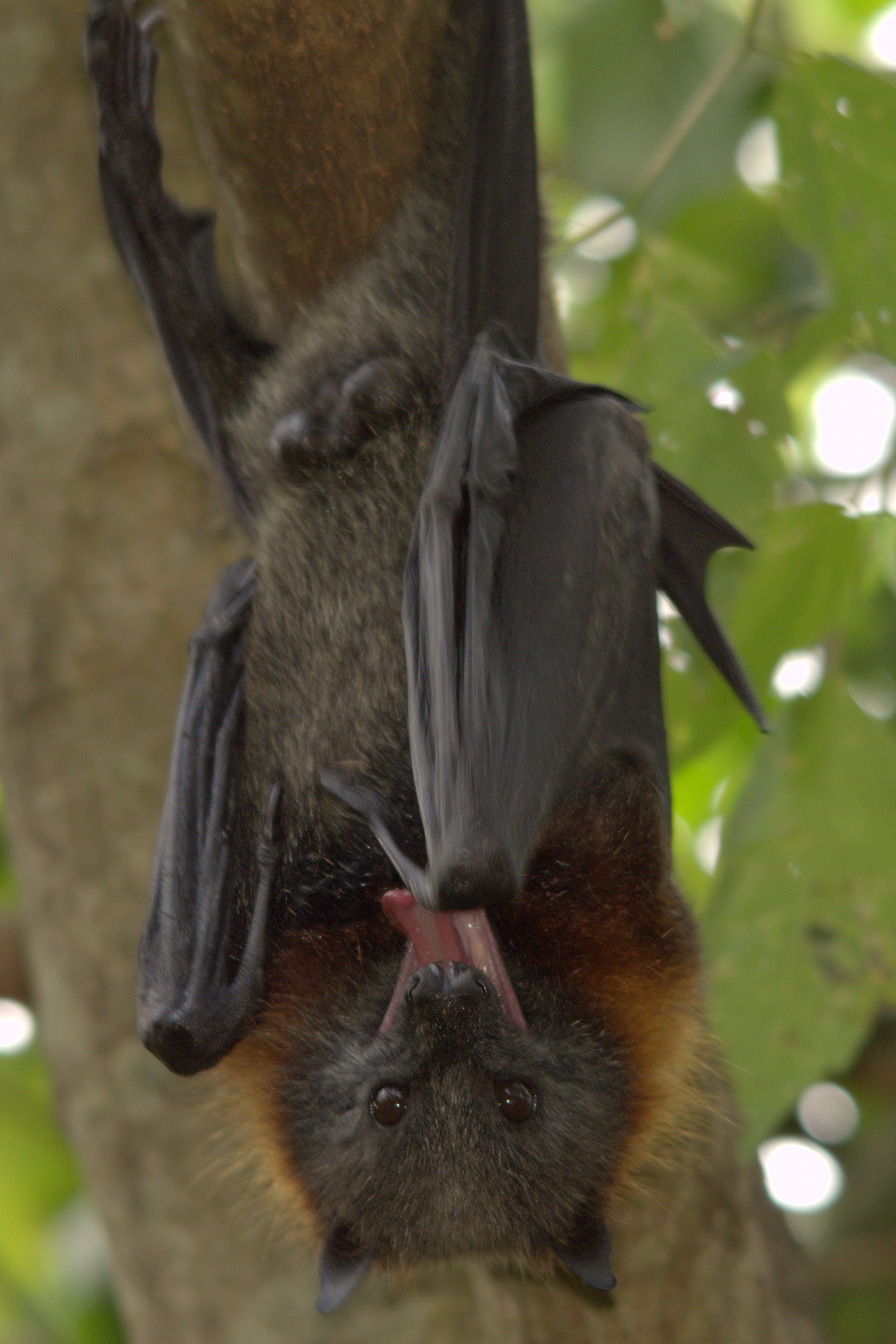
A male grey-headed flying fox, suffering from heat stress during a heatwave in New South Wales

Grey-headed flying foxes are exposed to several threats, most significantly the historical and ongoing loss of foraging and roost habitat throughout its geographical range and mass die-offs caused by a range of factors. Potential threats that are yet to be substantiated include competition with other flying fox species like the black flying fox and little red flying-fox and mortalities from aircraft strikes, wind turbine strikes and domestic pet attacks.

==== Extreme heat events ====
With anthropogenic climate change, extreme heat events have been increasing in both frequency and intensity, which can cause mass die-offs of roost individuals. A synthesis of known extreme heat events between 1994 and 2008 estimated that more than 24,500 grey-headed flying foxes had died from extreme heat events during that period. To date, the largest record of mortalities from extreme heat events occurred in the austral summer of 2019-20, with consolidated data from wildlife rehabilitators, land managers and conservationists indicating a minimum estimate of 72 175 flying foxes killed, comprising both grey-headed and black flying foxes.

A range of intervention methods are employed by first responders, mainly wildlife rehabilitators, including spraying water on roost vegetation or the animals directly and removing animals from colonies to administer cooling and rehydration therapies; however the efficacy of many of these methods have not been evaluated empirically. Current research is investigating the efficacy of site-scale interventions such as running sprinklers.

==== Entanglements in man-made materials ====
Like other animals, grey-headed flying-foxes are frequently entangled in human-made materials such as netting, barbed wire fencing and discarded fishing lines. An analysis of wildlife rescue records in NSW found that the grey-headed flying-fox was the most prominent threatened species in reported entanglement incidents between 2011 and 2021.

Efforts to curb entanglement incidents have included promoting and adopting the use of wildlife-safe netting and removing old or unnecessary barbed wire. Anecdotally, it is believed that marking barbed wire with bright paint may increase visibility for flying foxes and help them avoid colliding with the wire strands.

==== Disturbance at roost sites ====
When present in urban environments, grey-headed flying foxes are sometimes perceived as a nuisance. Cultivated orchard fruits are also taken, but apparently only at times when other food items are scarce. Because their roosting and foraging habits bring the species into conflict with humans, they suffer from direct killing of animals in orchards and harassment and destruction of roosts.

==== Poisoning ====
The urbanised camps of cities were noted as succumbing to poisoning during the 1970s to 1980s, identified as the lead in petrol that would accumulate on the fur and enter the body when grooming. The mortality rate from toxic levels of lead in the environment dropped with the introduction of unleaded fuel in 1985.

An introduced plant, the cocos palm Syagrus romanzoffiana, now banned by some local councils, bears fruit that is toxic to this species and has resulted in their death; the Chinese elm Ulmus parvifolia and privet present this same hazard.

==== Diseases ====
The species is vulnerable to diseases that may kill large numbers within a camp, and the sudden incidence of premature births in colonies is likely to significantly impact the re-population of the group; the cause of these disorders or diseases is unknown.

==== Shooting ====
The early twentieth century saw the incursion of Pteropus poliocephalus to the opportunities they discovered at orchards, and the government placed a bounty on the declared pest. Their reputation for destroying fruit crops was noted by John Gould in 1863, though the extent of actual damage was often greatly exaggerated. When Ratcliffe submitted his report, he noted the number of paid bounties was 300,000, and this would not have included the mortally wounded escapees or those left suspended at roosts by the grip that is held by their weight. This species continued to be killed or wounded by shotguns, many remaining disabled where they fell after the bounty was stopped, despite the advice of Ratcliffe and later researchers on an ineffective and uneconomical practice and the needless extermination of the population. Orchardists have begun shifting to the use of netting that also discourages the daytime visits of birds, a transition that has been assisted by funding programs such as the Flying-fox Netting Subsidy Program in NSW. The impact of indiscriminate shooting of bats has resulted in the species being declared vulnerable to extinction, to the tree species that relied on them for regeneration, the subsequent alteration to the forest ecology of the eastern states

=== Status and protection ===
To answer some of the growing threats, roost sites have been legally protected since 1986 in New South Wales and since 1994 in Queensland. In 1999, the species was classified as "Vulnerable to extinction" in The Action Plan for Australian Bats, and has since been protected across its range under Australian federal law, listed as Vulnerable under the Environment Protection and Biodiversity Conservation Act 1999 (EPBC Act). A species recovery plan was created by the federal Department of Agriculture, Water and the Environment and the South Australian Department for Environment and Water and published in 2021.

As of 2021 the species is listed as "Vulnerable" on the IUCN Red List of Threatened Species under criteria A2ace and A4ac. Justification for the assessment says that "although the population is relatively large (exceeding 10,000 mature individuals) and it has a large extent of occurrence (> 20,000 km²), a continuing population decline is inferred to be more than 30–35% over the last three generations", and that further decline is expected.

=== Wildlife rescue ===
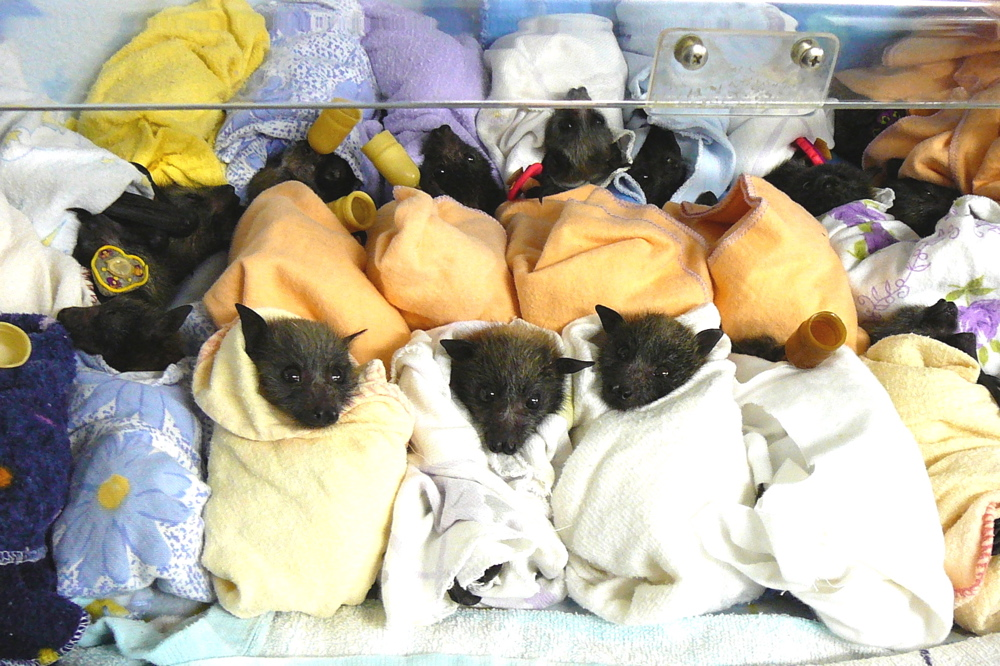
Crib full of abandoned babies rescued by Wildcare Australia in care at The Bat Hospital

Baby flying foxes usually come into care after having been separated from their mothers. Babies are often orphaned during four to six weeks of age, when they inadvertently fall off their mothers during flight, often due to disease or tick paralysis (their own and/or that of the mother).

Bat caregivers are not only specially trained in techniques to rescue and rehabilitate bats, but they are also vaccinated against rabies. Although the chance of contracting the rabies-like Australian bat lyssavirus is extremely small, bat caregivers are inoculated for their own protection.

== Gallery ==
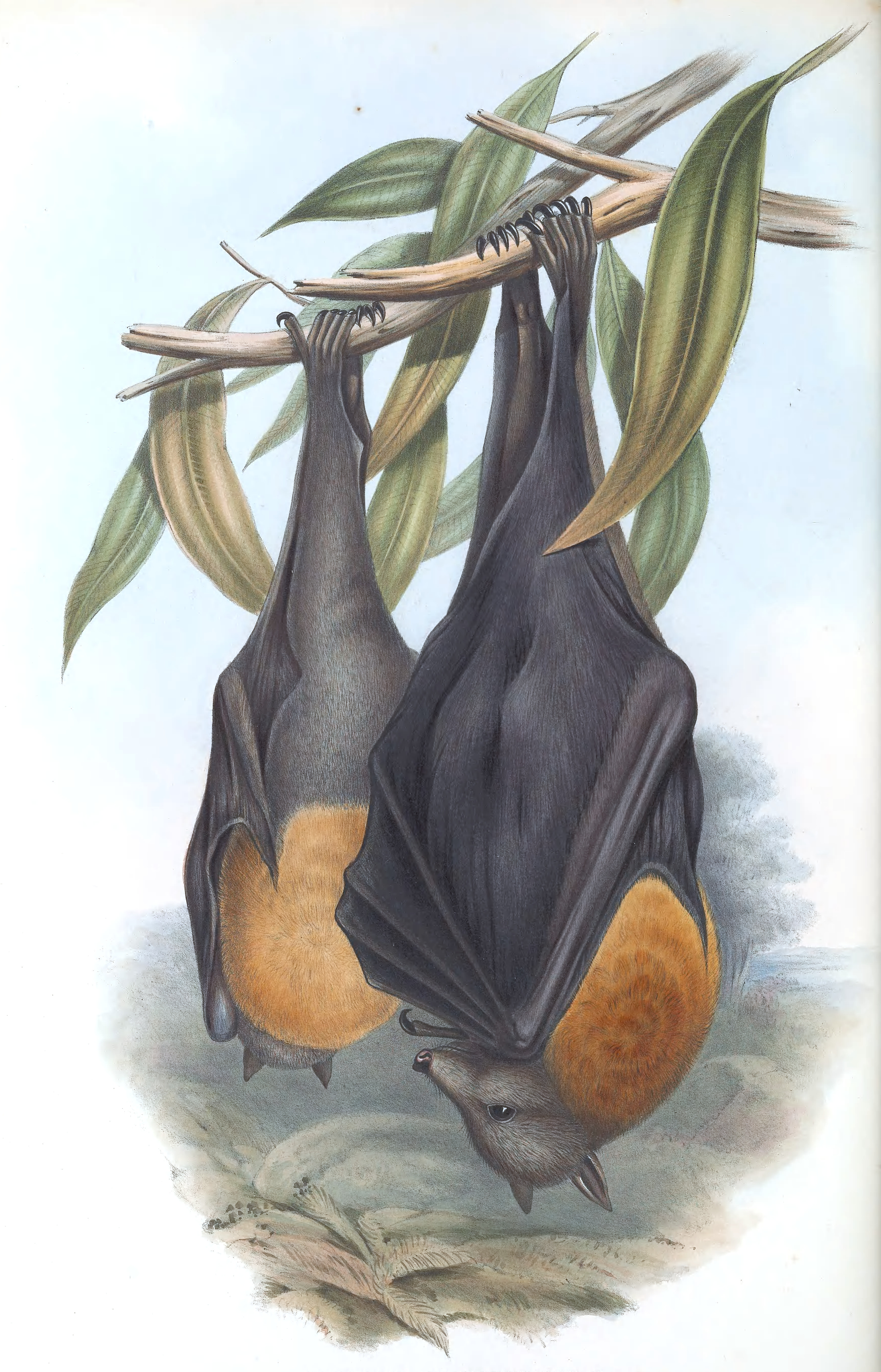
Grey-headed vampire by Henry Richter 1863.

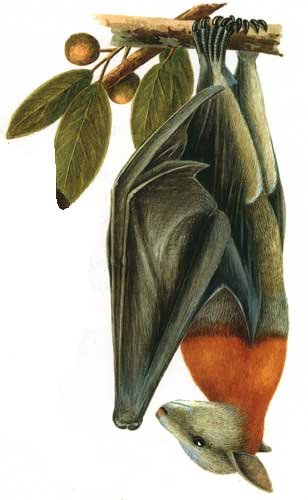
Illustration of grey-headed flying fox by Neville W. Cayley (1887–1950)

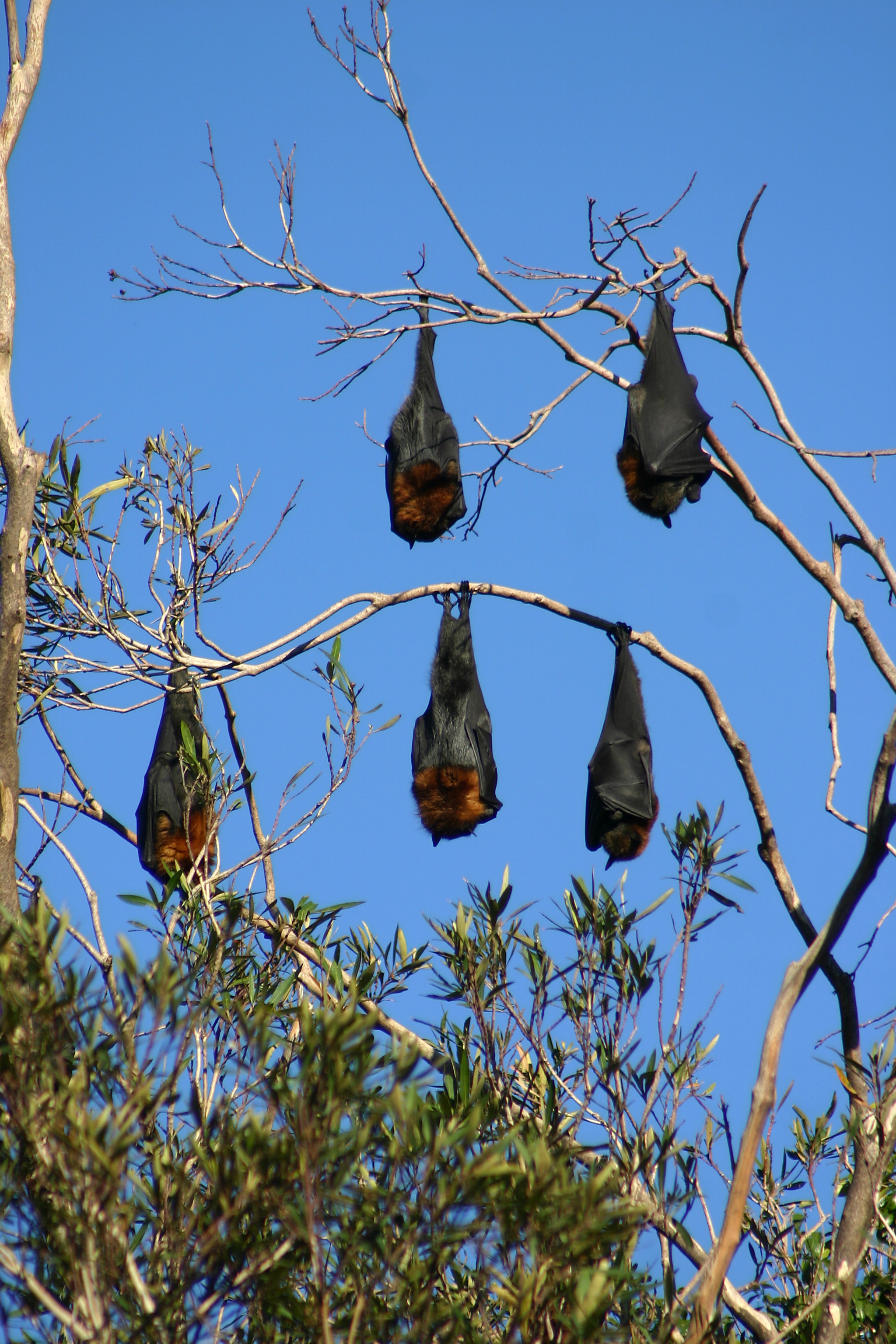
Grey-headed flying foxes in the Royal Botanic Garden, Sydney

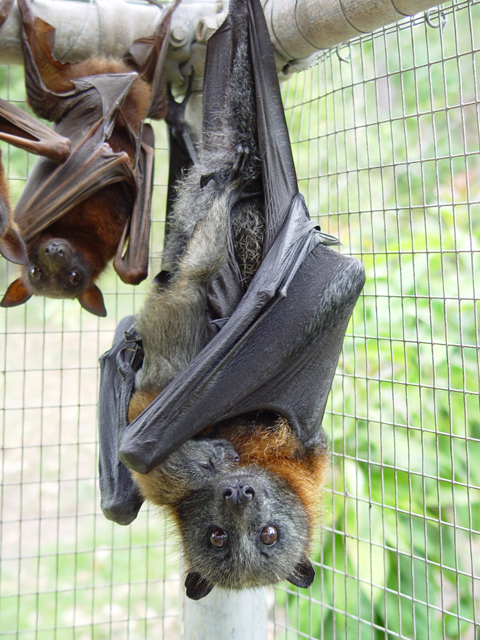
Grey-headed flying fox with baby (the smaller bat in the back is a little red flying fox

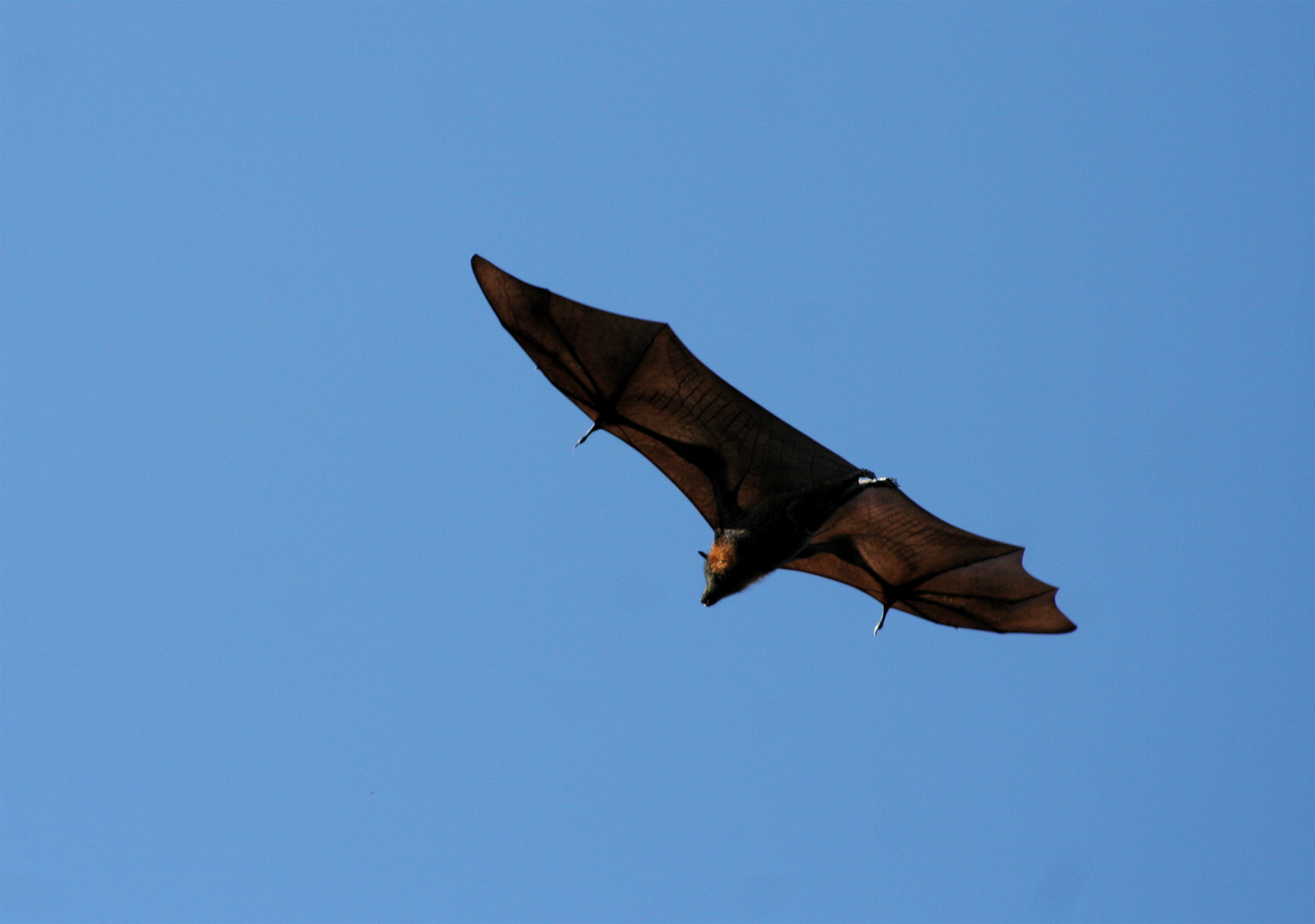
Grey-headed flying fox in flight

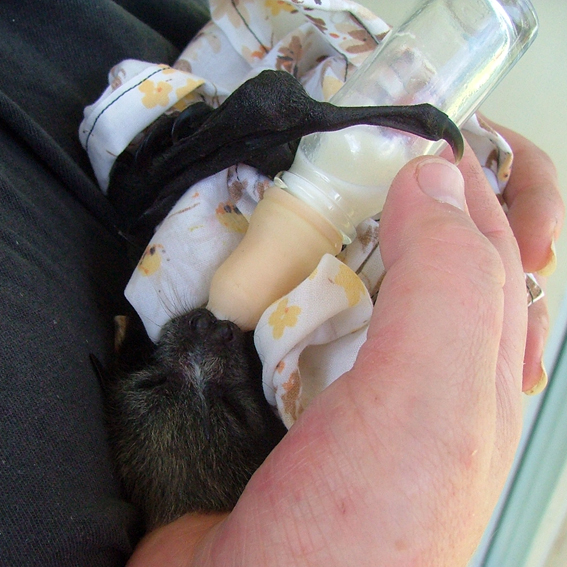
A 17-day-old female grey-headed flying fox in care of WIRES

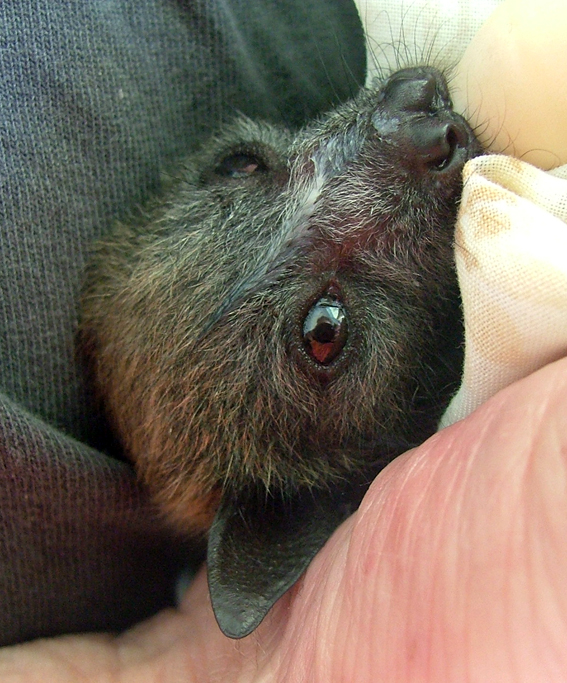
Young female grey-headed flying fox in care of WIRES

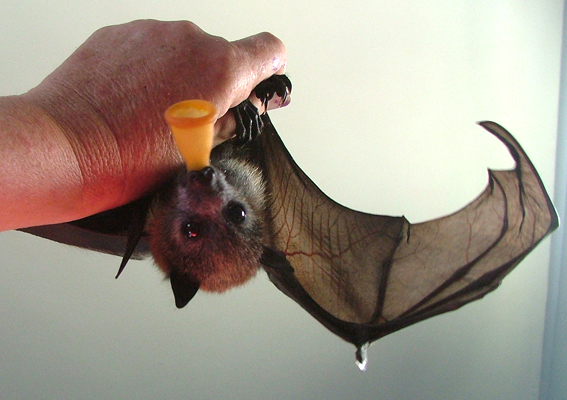
Young female grey-headed flying fox playing with her WIRES caretaker

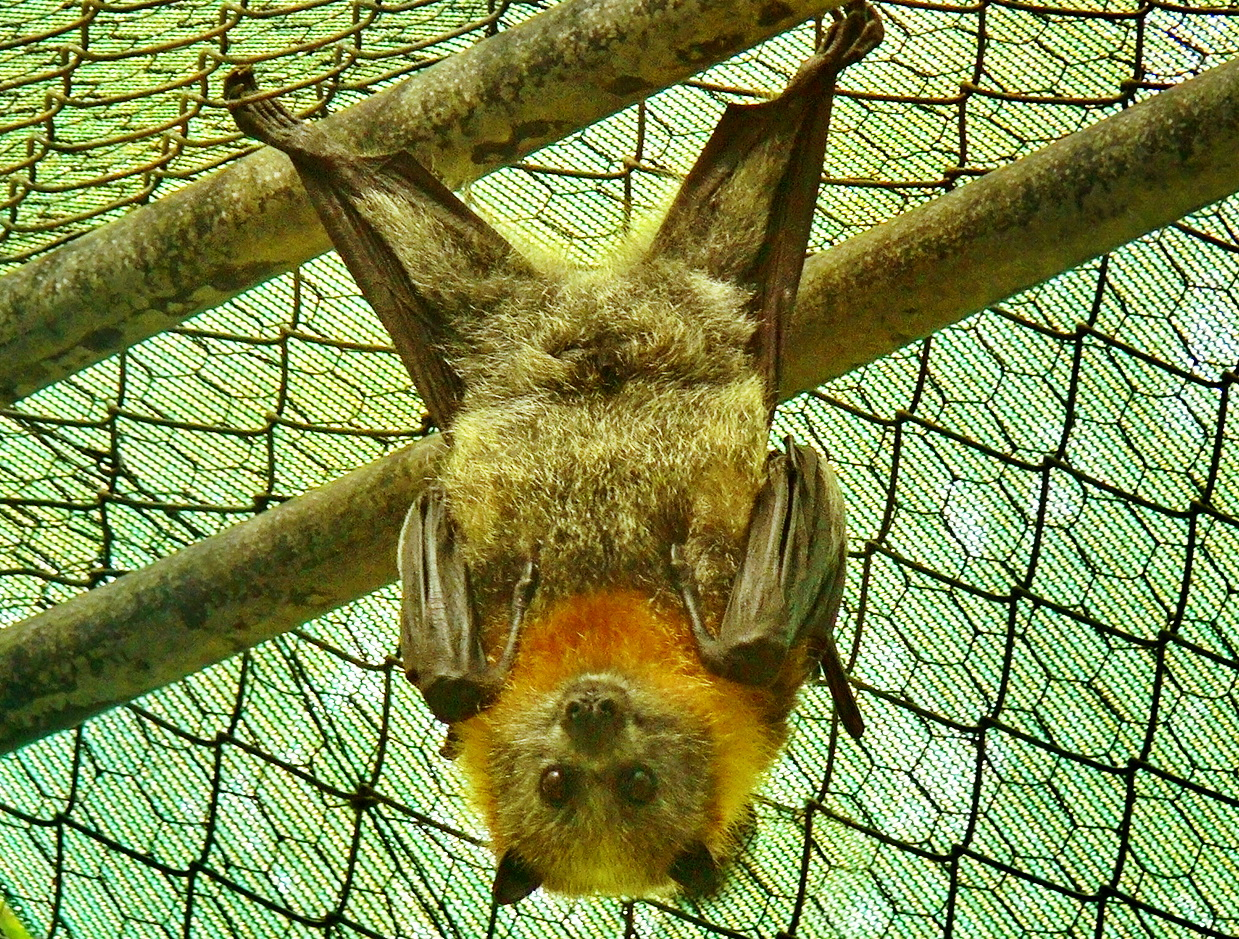
Grey-headed flying fox in captivity

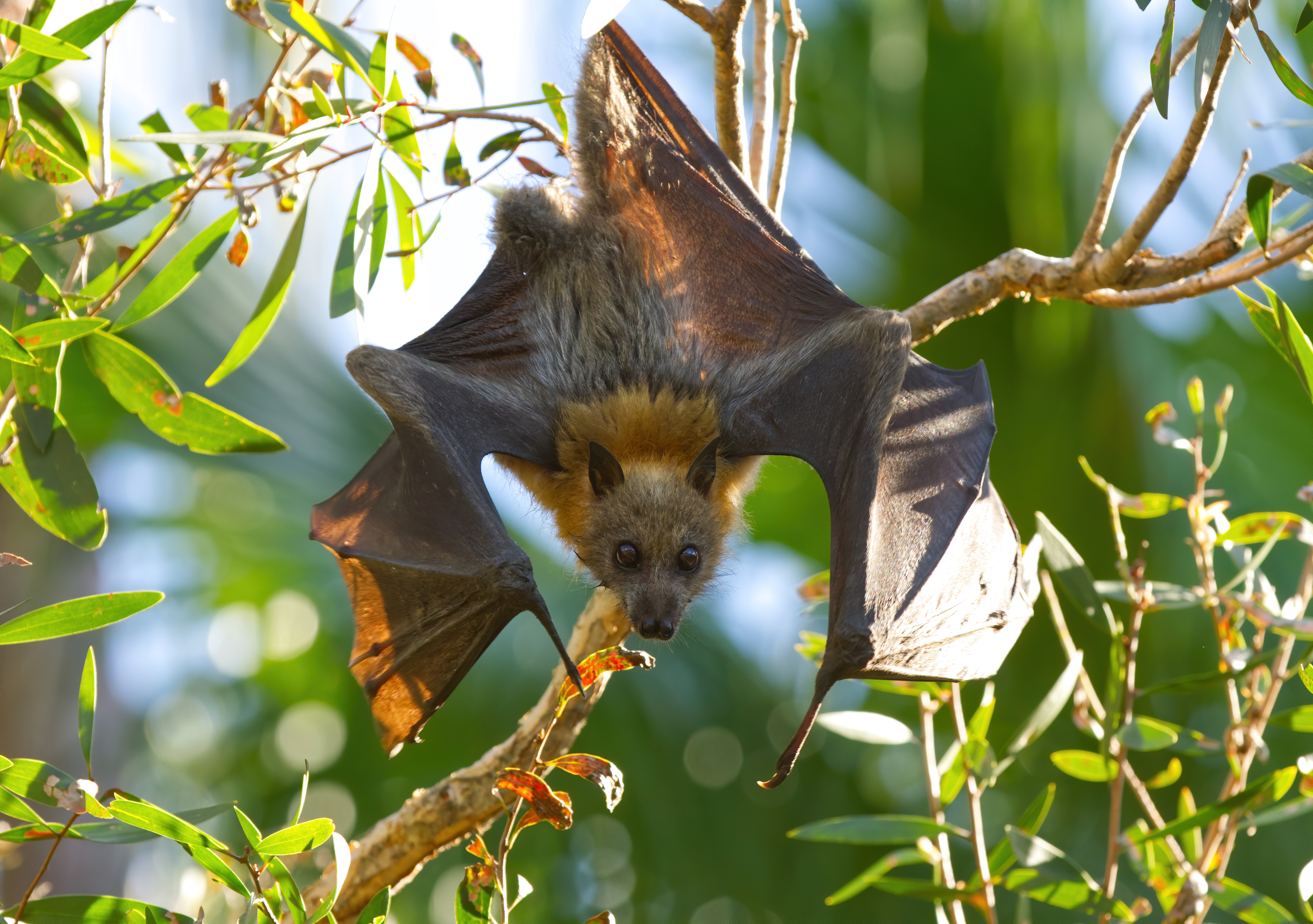
Taking off.

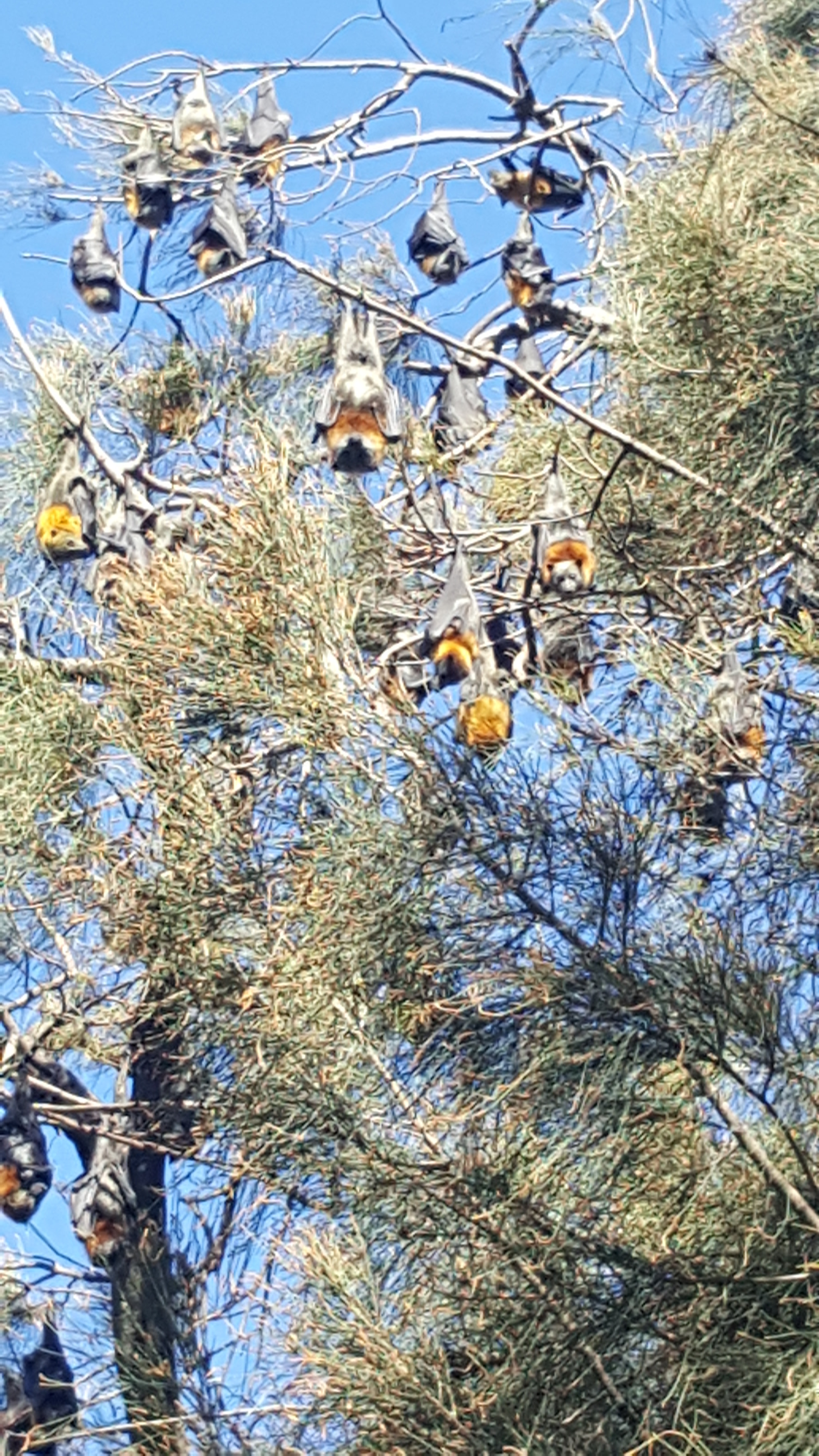
Grey-headed flying fox at Parramatta Park, NSW, Australia
