= Mataranka =

Mataranka may refer to:

- Mataranka, Northern Territory, a town and locality in Australia
- Mataranka Falls, a water fall in Australia
- Mataranka Hot Springs, a hot spring in Australia
- Mataranka Palm, a common name for the palm species Livistona rigida
- Mataranka Primary School, a school – refer List of schools in the Northern Territory
