= Elsey National Park =

National park in the Northern Territory, Australia

Coordinates: 14°57′16″S 133°11′11″E

- IUCN category II (national park)
- Map of Elsey National Park
- Location: Northern Territory
- Nearest city: Mataranka
- Area: 138.96 km^{2} (53.65 sq mi)
- Established: 1991
- Visitors: 207,700 (in 2022)
- Governing body: Parks and Wildlife Commission of the Northern Territory
- Website: Official website

Elsey National Park is 378 km southeast of Darwin in the Katherine Region in the Northern Territory of Australia, extending from 2 km to 19 km east of Mataranka. Features of the park include Mataranka Falls, and the Mataranka Thermal Pools.

The thermal springs are home to a well known colony of the little red fruit-bat, species Pteropus scapulatus, an attraction that has also been discouraged from inhabiting the site for the strong odour of their camps. These fruit eating bats roost during the day at the stands of bamboo, often in large numbers, and leave at night to feed on nectar from trees.

== Gallery ==
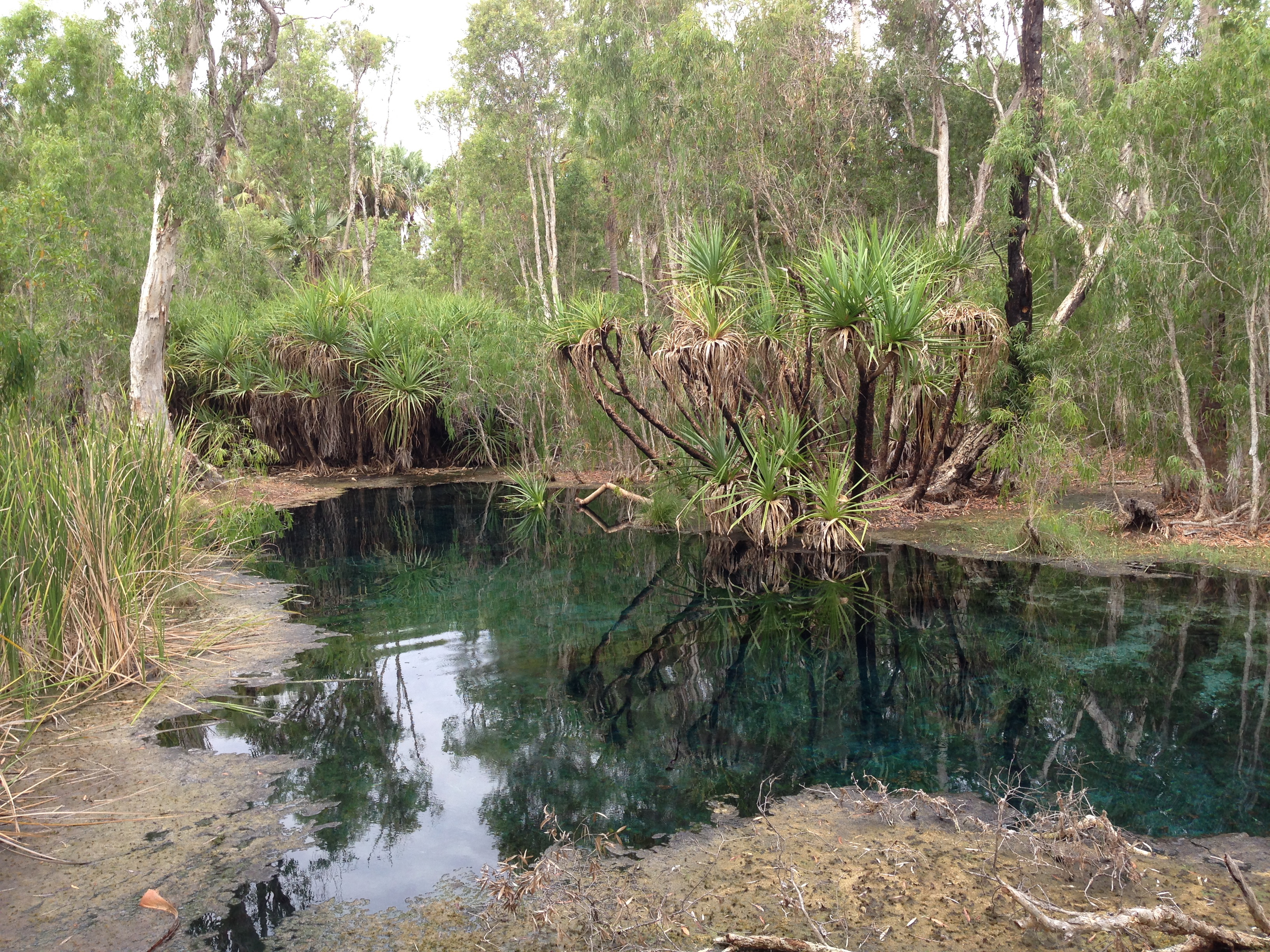
Bitter Springs

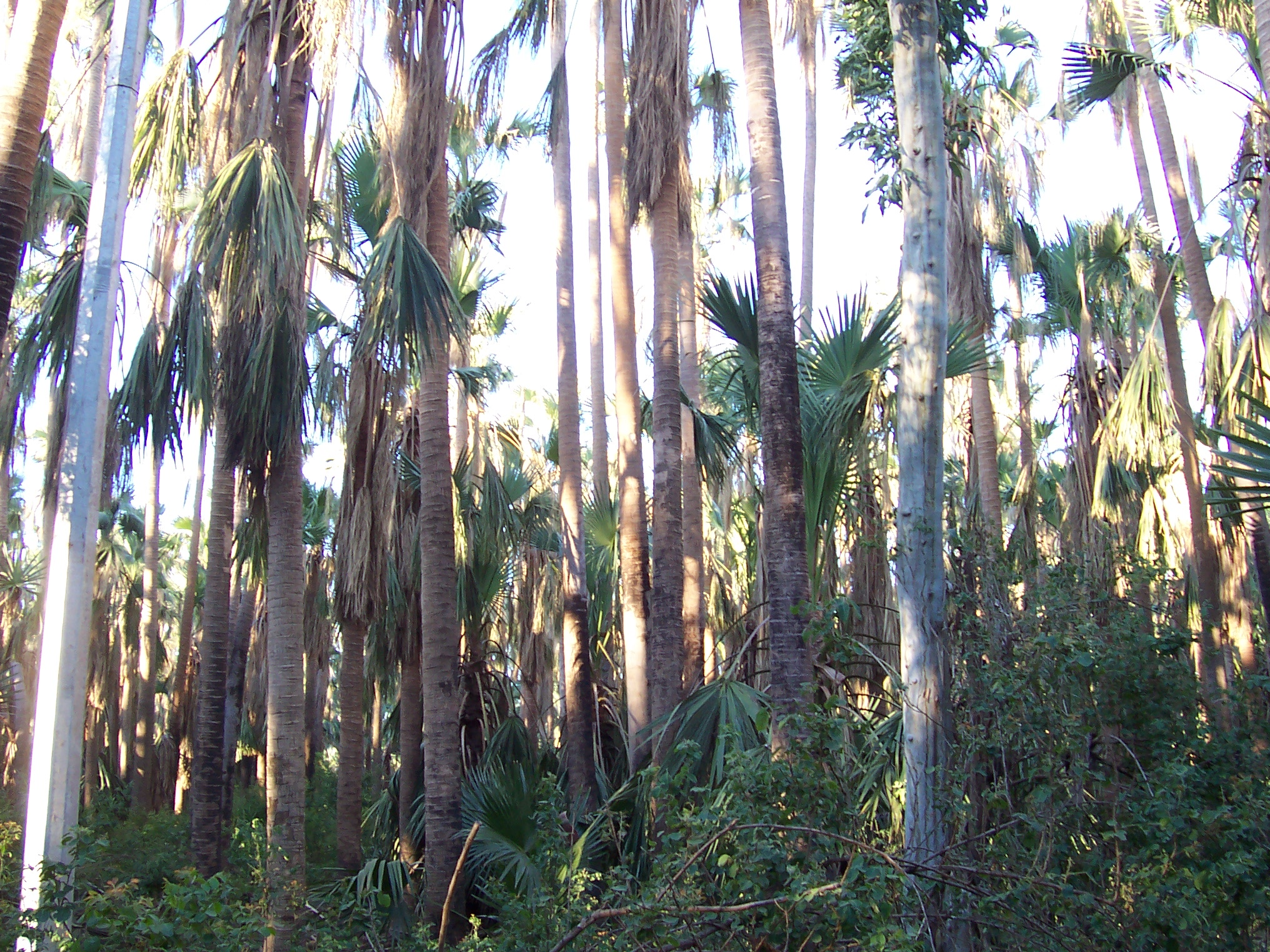
Trees in Elsey National Park

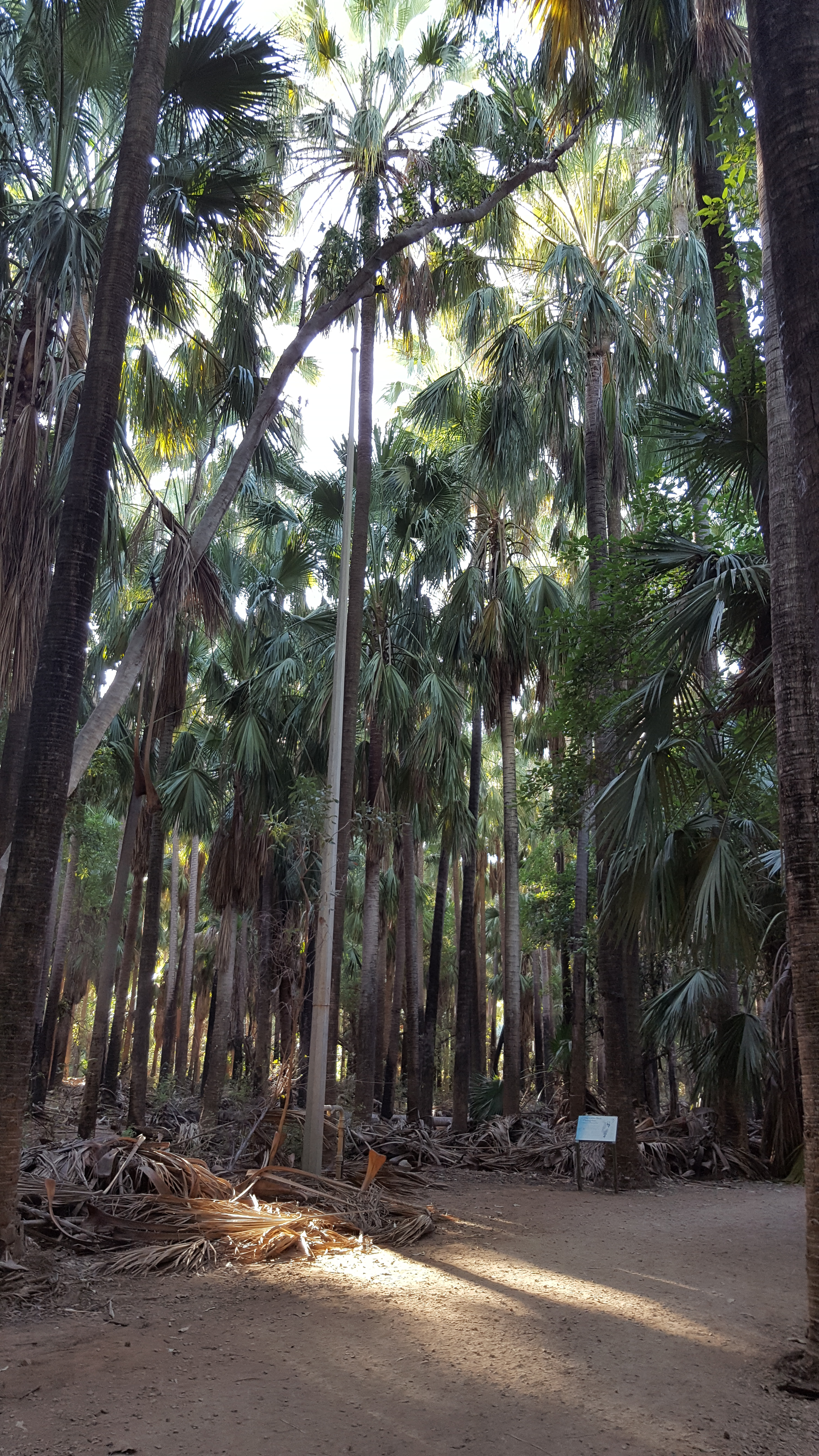
Elsey National Park

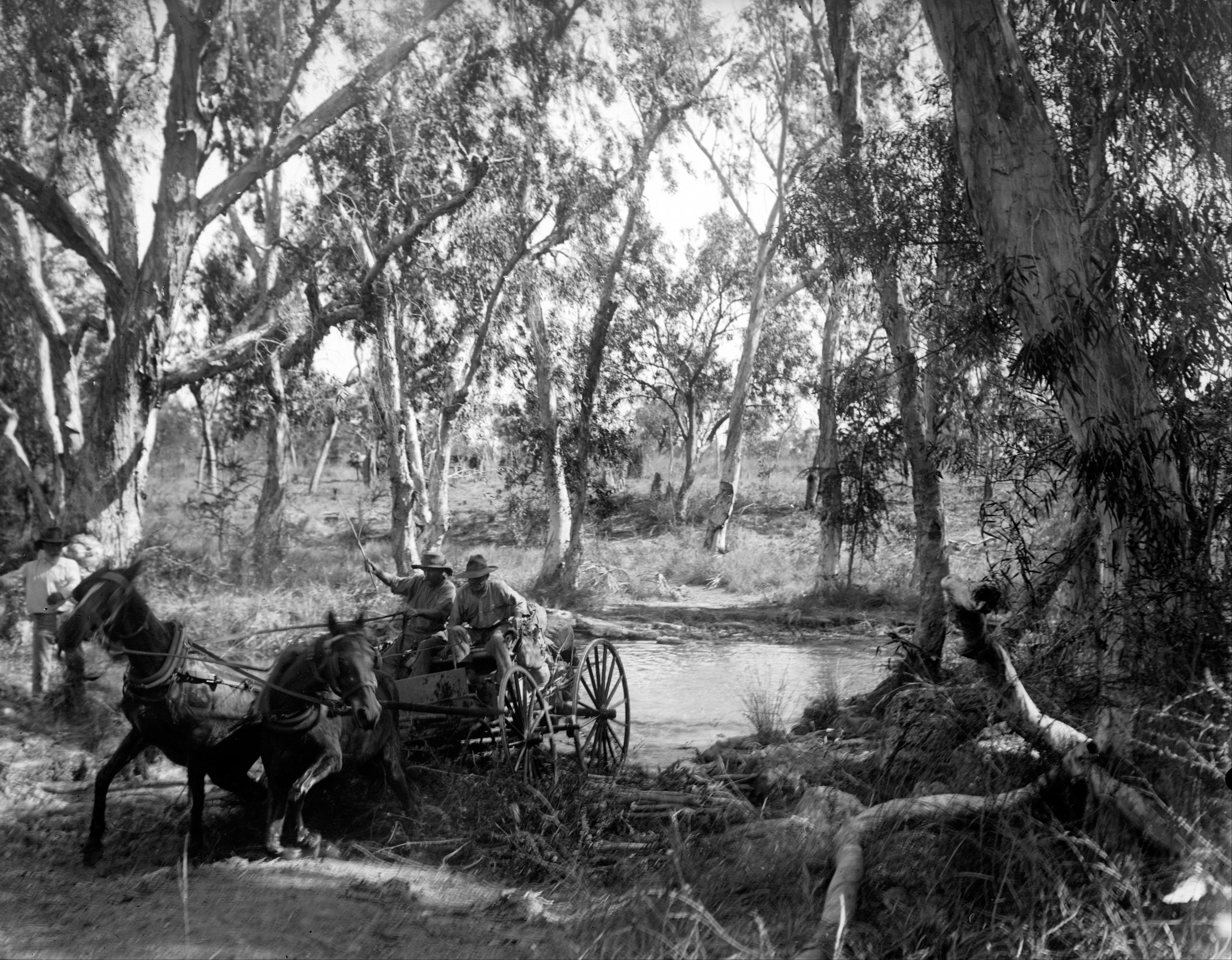
Walter Baldwin Spencer, crossing the Salt Creek near the Roper River, July 1911

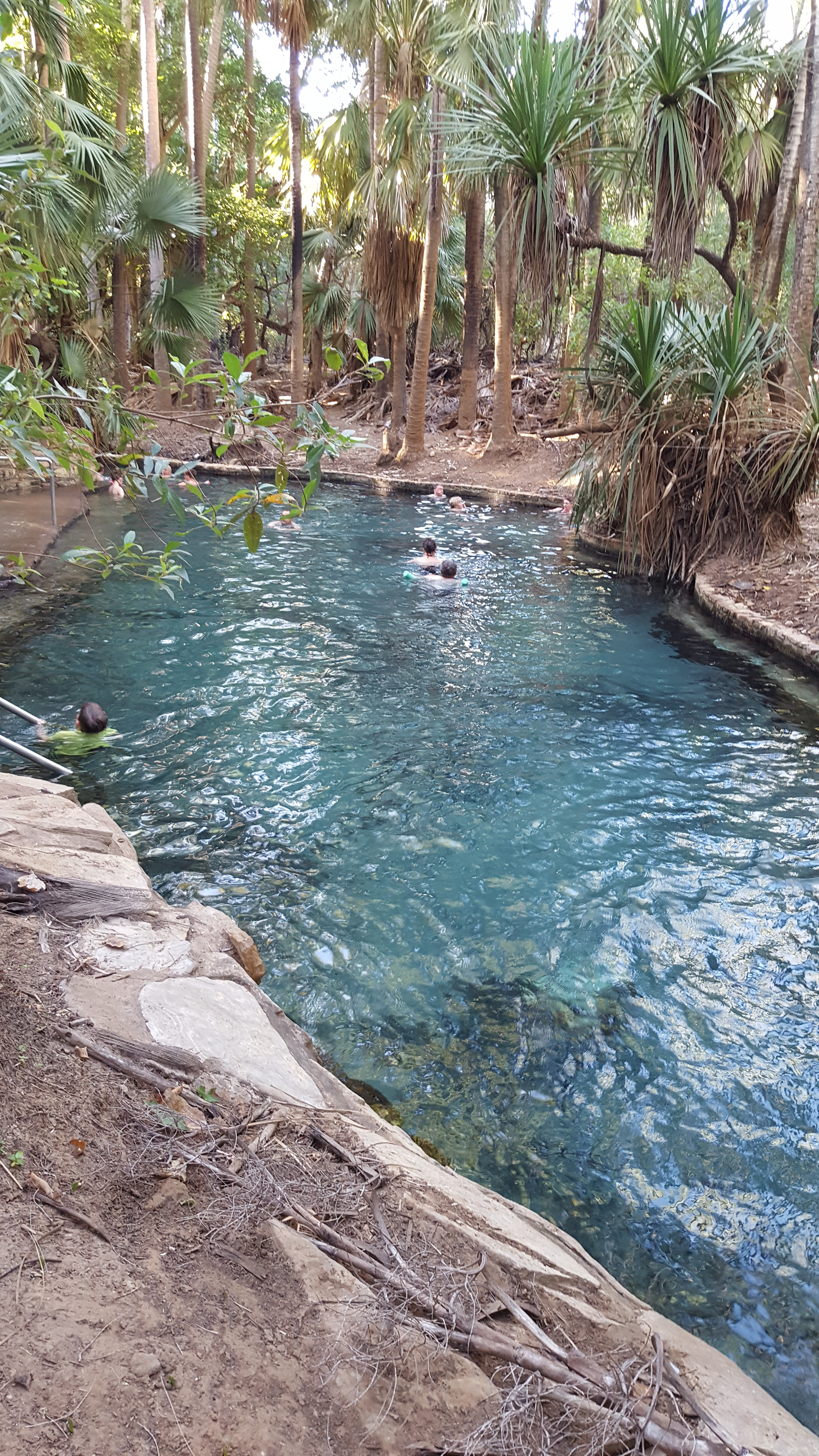
Mataranka Thermal Springs

== See also ==
- Protected areas of the Northern Territory
