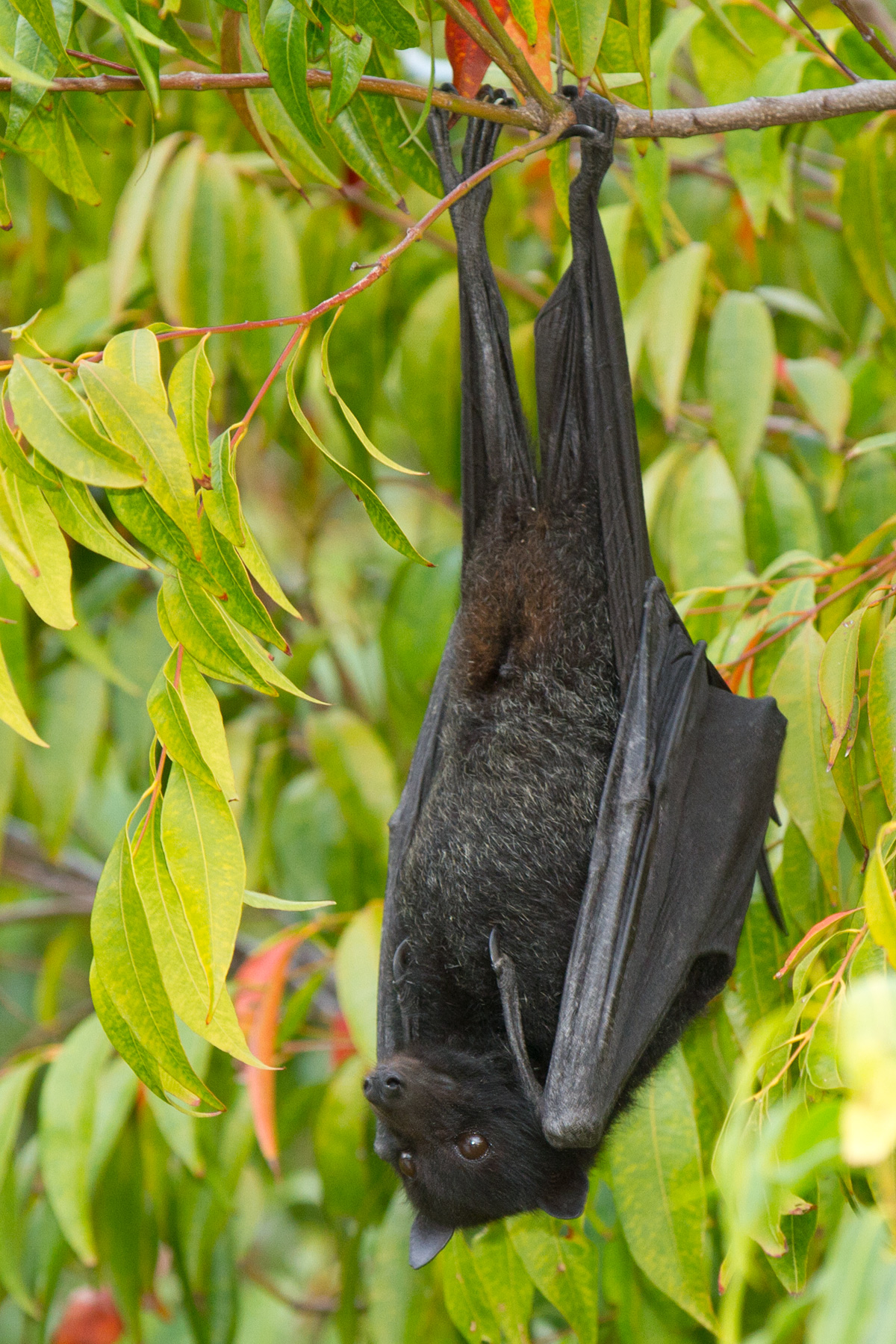

Conservation status
- Least Concern (IUCN 3.1)

Scientific classification
- Kingdom: Animalia
- Phylum: Chordata
- Class: Mammalia
- Order: Chiroptera
- Family: Pteropodidae
- Genus: Pteropus
- Species: P. alecto

Binomial name
- Pteropus alecto Temminck, 1837

Subspecies
- P. a. alecto; P. a. aterrimus; P. a. gouldi; P. a. morio
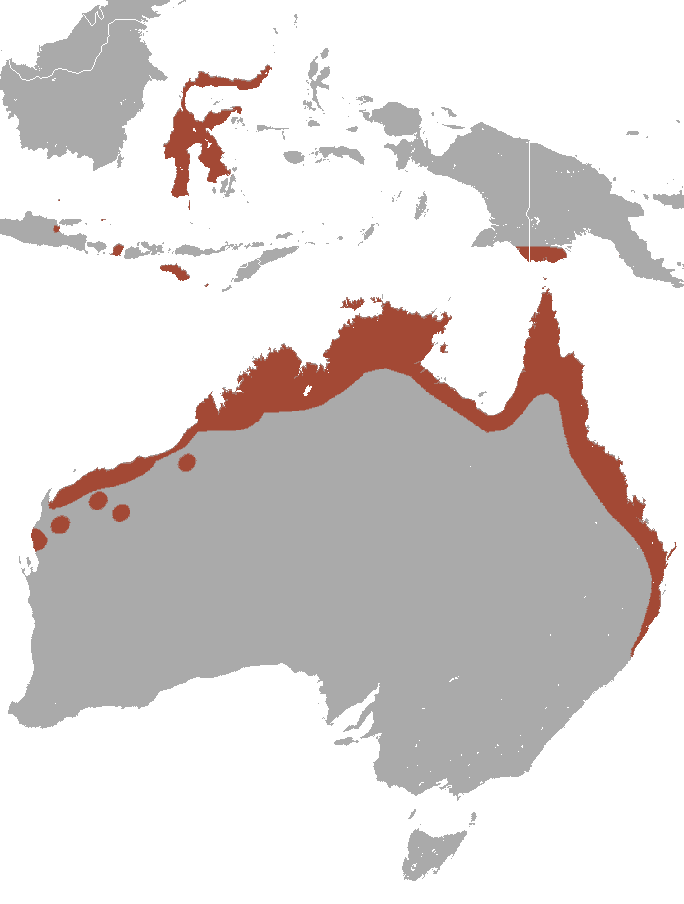
- Black flying fox range

= Black flying fox =

Species of mammal

Roosting colony of Black Flying Fox in Perrin Park, Brisbane, Australia, in late afternoon. Children in an adjacent playground can be heard also.
recorded 9 September 2018

The black flying fox or black fruit bat (Pteropus alecto) is a bat in the family Pteropodidae. It is among the largest bats in the world, but is considerably smaller than the largest species in its genus, Pteropus. The black flying fox is native to Australia, Papua New Guinea, and Indonesia. It is not a threatened species.

== Taxonomy ==
Juvenile specimens of this species from Moa Island in Torres Strait have been described as a separate species, Pteropus banakrisi. This supposed species was known as the "Torresian flying fox" or "Moa Island fruit bat".

== Description ==
The black flying fox has short, black hair with a contrasting reddish-brown mantle, and a mean forearm length of 164 mm (6.46 in) and a mean weight of 710 g (1.57 lb). It is one of the largest bat species in the world, and has a wingspan of more than 1 metre (39 in).

== Distribution ==
Black flying foxes are native to Australia (New South Wales, Queensland, Northern Territory and Western Australia), Papua New Guinea (Western Province) and Indonesia (West Papua, Sulawesi, Sumba, and Savu).

== Roosting habits ==
During the day, individuals reside in large roosts (colonies or 'camps') consisting of hundreds to tens of thousands of individuals. They sometimes share their roosts with the grey-headed flying fox (Pteropus poliocephalus), the spectacled flying fox (P. conspicillatus), and/or the little red flying fox (P. scapulatus). They roost in mangroves, paperbark swamps, patches of rainforest and bamboo forests, and very rarely in caves or underneath overhangs.

== Reproduction ==
Black flying foxes breed once a year. A single young is born, and carried by its mother for the first month of life, after which it is left behind in the roost when the mother is out foraging at night.

== Diet ==
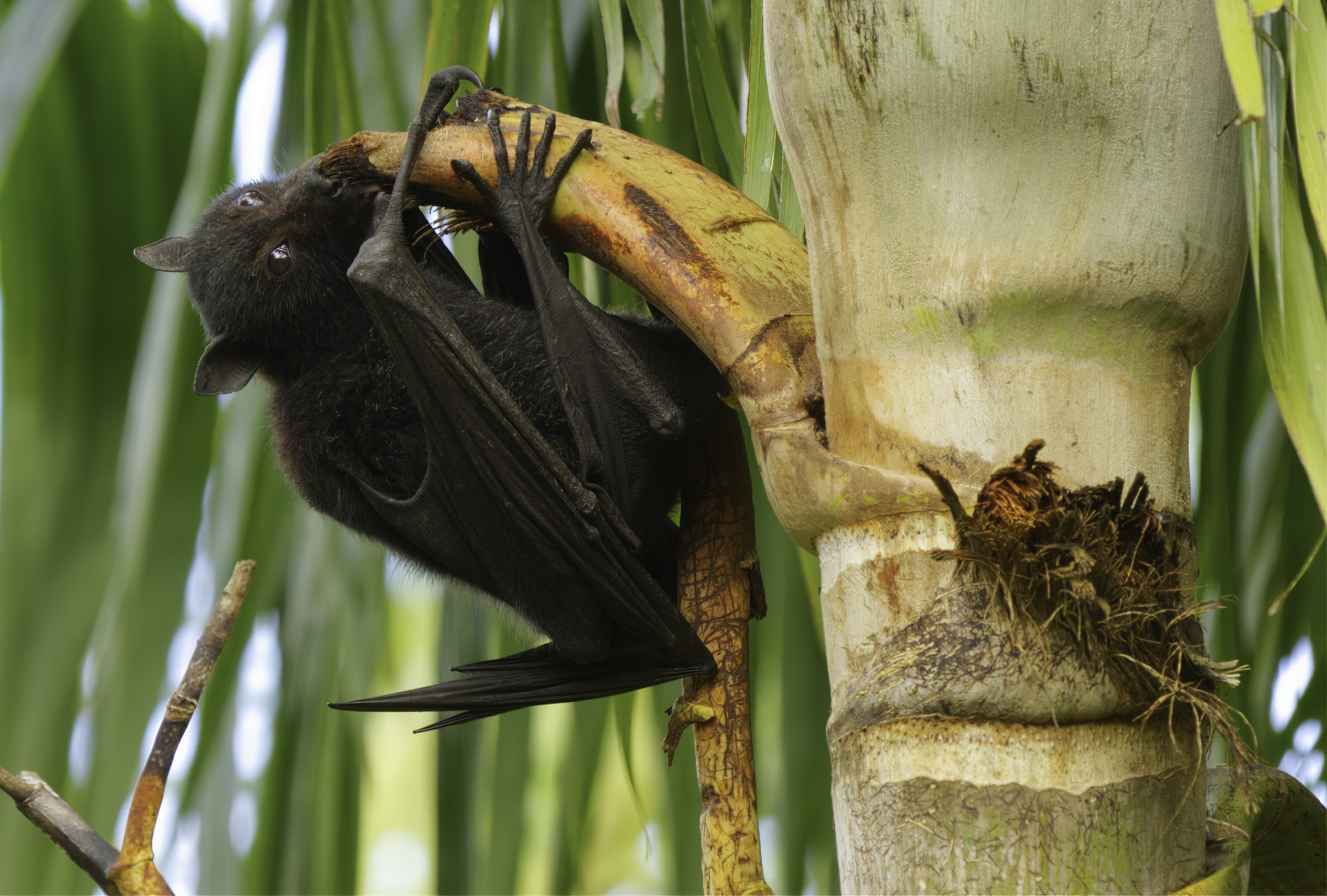
Black flying fox feeding on a palm, Brisbane, Australia

Black flying foxes eat pollen and nectar from native eucalyptus, lilypillies, paperbark, and turpentine trees. When native foods are scarce, particularly during drought, the bats may take introduced or commercial fruits, such as mangos and apples. This species had been known to travel up to 50 km (31 mi) a night in search of food. In residential areas, the species has adapted to eating introduced cocos palm trees as a substitute for scarcer native species - and now accounts for around 30% of the animals' food source. However, the high acidity of the palm fruits can prove toxic and may lead to death.

== Conservation ==
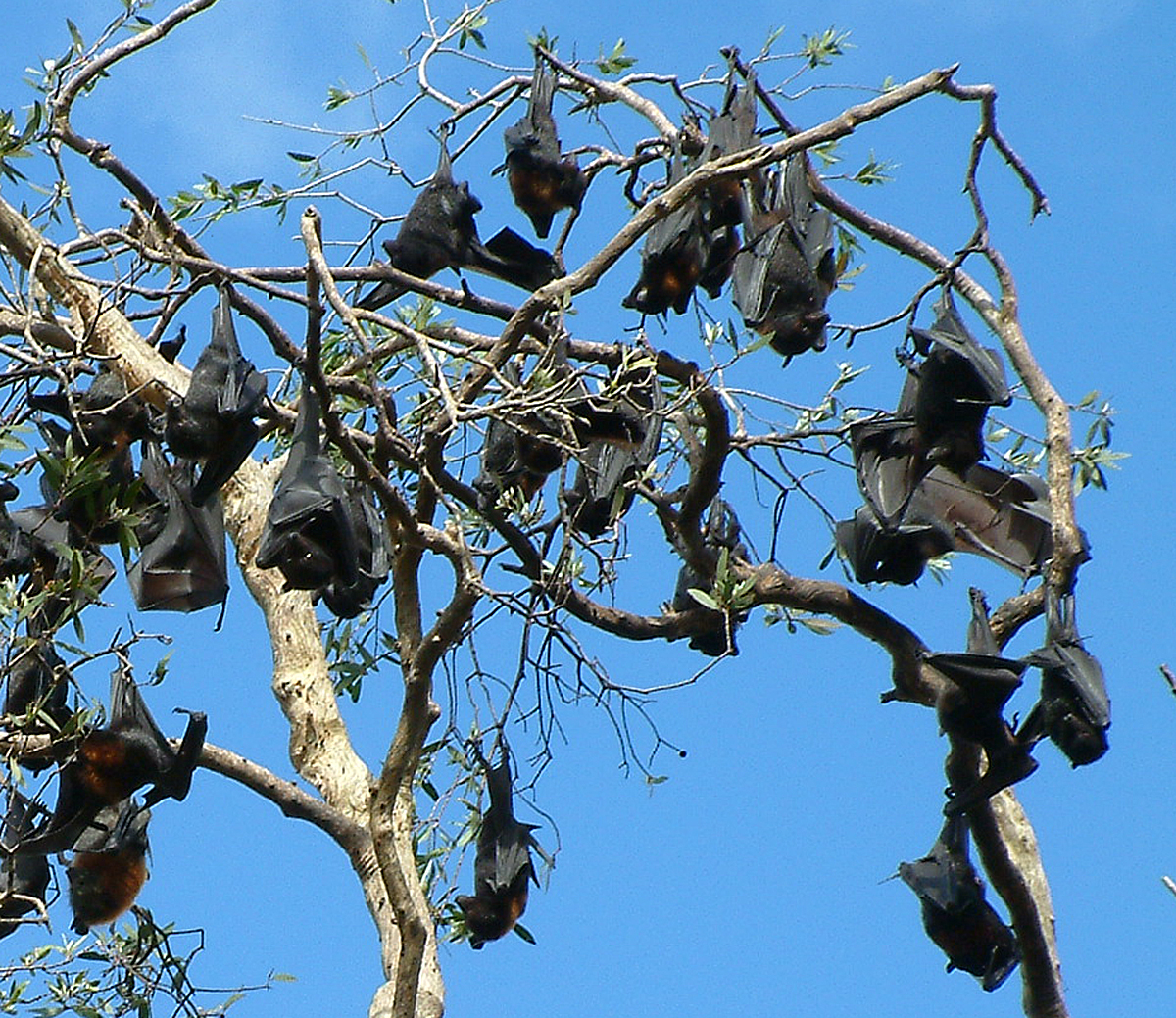
Group in northern New South Wales, Australia

The black flying fox is not listed as threatened on the IUCN Red List; nevertheless, the species is exposed to several threats, including loss of foraging and roosting habitat, and mass die-offs caused by extreme temperature events. Because climate change is predicted to make Australia hotter, the negative impacts this species faces from extreme temperature events are expected to grow into a larger problem. According to one study, these animals begin to die once temperatures reach above 40°C. Another study of records from wildlife rehabilitation clinics in Australia found that heat stress particularly affected black flying foxes compared to other flying fox species. Clinic records indicated that 46% of wildlife rescues of black flying foxes were due to heat stress, compared to 18% of grey-headed flying fox rescues and 8% of little red flying fox rescues.

When present in urban environments, black flying foxes are sometimes perceived as a nuisance. Because their roosting and foraging habits bring the species into conflict with humans, it suffers from direct killing of animals in orchards and harassment and destruction of roosts. In Indonesia, this species is frequently consumed as bushmeat, with concerns that the population loss might not be sustainable.

== As a disease vector ==
Negative public perception of the species has intensified with the discovery of three recently emerged zoonotic viruses that are potentially fatal to humans: Australian bat lyssavirus, Hendra virus, and Menangle virus. However, only the Australian bat lyssavirus is known from two isolated cases to be directly transmissible from bats to humans.

== Wildlife rescue ==
Flying foxes often come to the attention of Australian wildlife care and rescue organisations, such as Wildcare Australia, Orphan Native Animal Rear and Release Association Incorporated, Wildlife Carers Darling Downs, Bat Care, Bat Rescue, Tweed Valley Wildlife Carers, and WIRES when reported as injured, sick, orphaned or abandoned. A very high proportion of adult flying fox injuries are caused by entanglement in barbed wire fences or loose, improperly erected fruit tree netting, both of which can result in very serious injuries and a slow, agonizing death for the animal if not rescued quickly.
