= Mataranka Thermal Pools =

Thermal spring system in Australia

- Mantaranka Hot Springs; Mantaranka Springs Complex
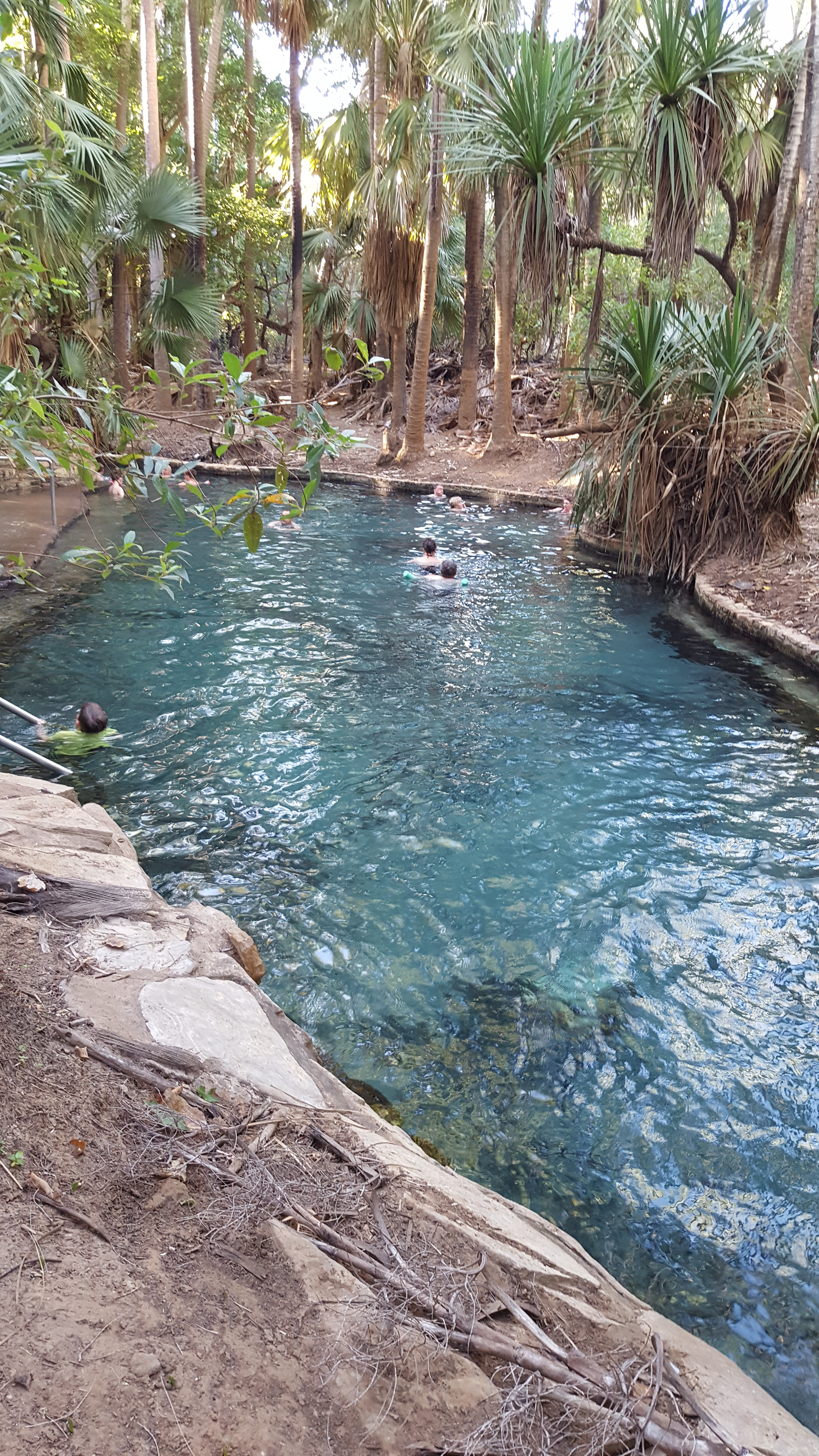

- Location within Australia
- Interactive map of Mataranka Thermal Pools
- Location: Elsey National Park, Mataranka, Australia
- Coordinates: 14°55′29.4″S 133°8′19.4″E
- Spring source: Cambrian Limestone Aquifer
- Type: geothermal
- Discharge: 30.5 million litres per day
- Temperature: 34 °C (93 °F)

The Mataranka Thermal Pools are a series of geothermal hot spring systems located in Elsey National Park in the Northern Territory, Australia. They are also known as the Mataranka Hot Springs or the Mataranka Springs Complex.

== Description ==
The Mataranka hot springs system "holds great cultural significance for Aboriginal communities in the surrounding area." The springs form the headwaters of the Roper River; they are fed by the Cambrian Limestone Aquifer. There are several thermal spring soaking pools in the area that are fringed with palm trees and paperbark trees. The hot springs are located along Homestead Road, Mataranka approximately one hour south of the town of Katherine by car. The nearby area is grasslands with some woodland areas.

Nearby are the Rainbow Springs and Bitter Springs.

=== Bat populations ===
The humid and well shaded environment at the soaking pool areas host a large colony of flying fox. As many as 500,000 flying foxes roost here, making the colony one of the most populous in the area. The springs also host a colony of Pteropus scapulatus, the little red fruit-bat. They roost during the day feeding in bamboo and at night they feed on nectar from nearby trees.

=== Environmental fragility ===
There is local concern that the development of a 450 hectare site known as Roper Plains Station, (formerly Stylo Station), will have a negative impact on the thermal pool environment as it would draw millions of litres of water from the geothermal spring source. The water rights licence held by the developer since 2013 would permit them to extract 5,800 megalitres of water per year from the underlying aquifer. There is also concern that the development "stripped indigenous territorians of their water rights".

== Water profile ==
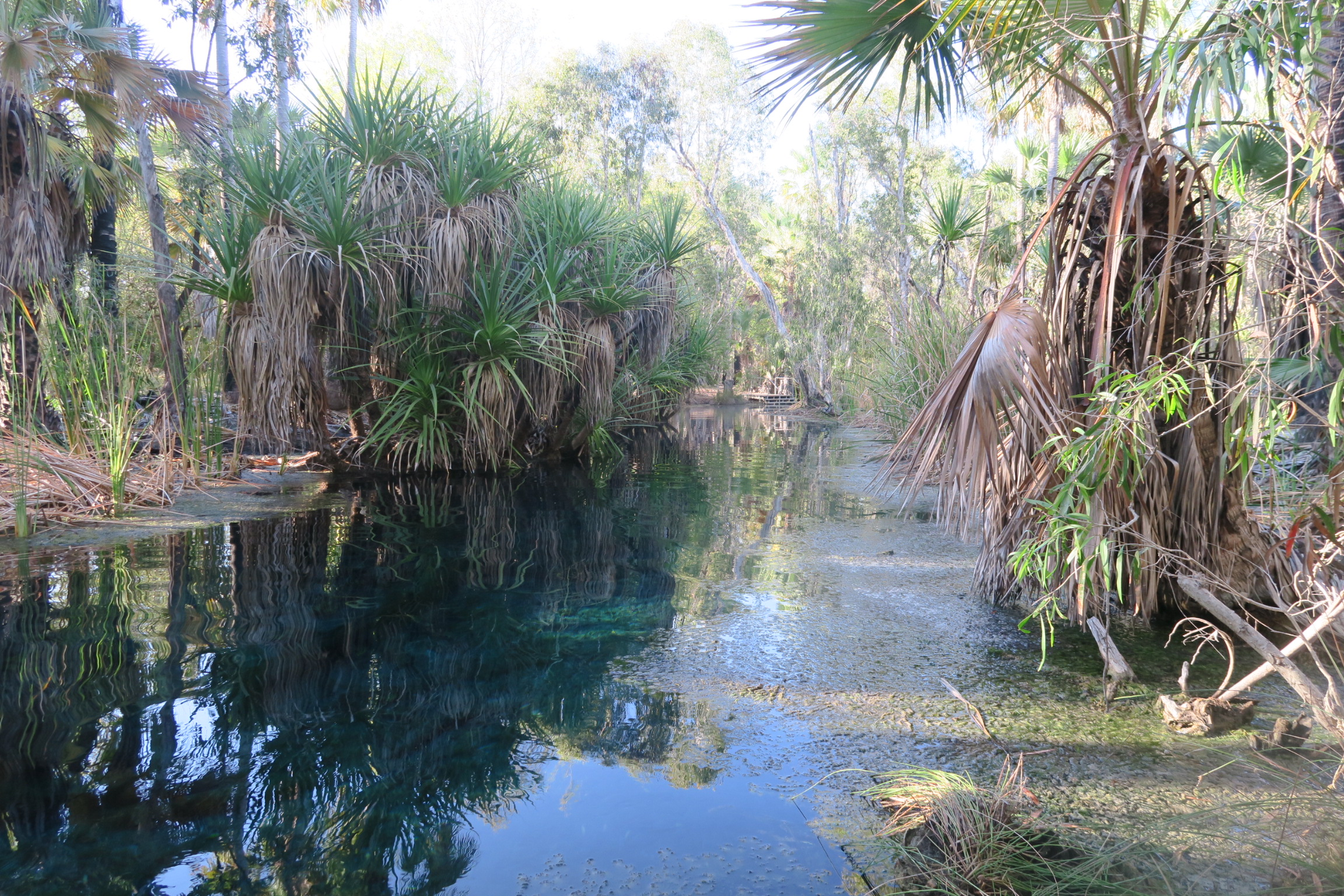
nearby Bitter Springs at dawn

The Mataranka Thermal Pool area is also referred to as the Mataranka Springs Complex or the Mataranka Hot Springs. The hot spring water has been described as "very warm year round", and crystal clear. The soaking pools have natural sandy bottoms. The nearby Rainbow Springs feeds the thermal pool.

The soaking pools at Mantaranka Thermal Springs maintain a fairly constant temperature of 34 °C (93 °F). The spring water emerges from the source at a rate of 30.5 million litres per day.
