= Indooroopilly Island Conservation Park =

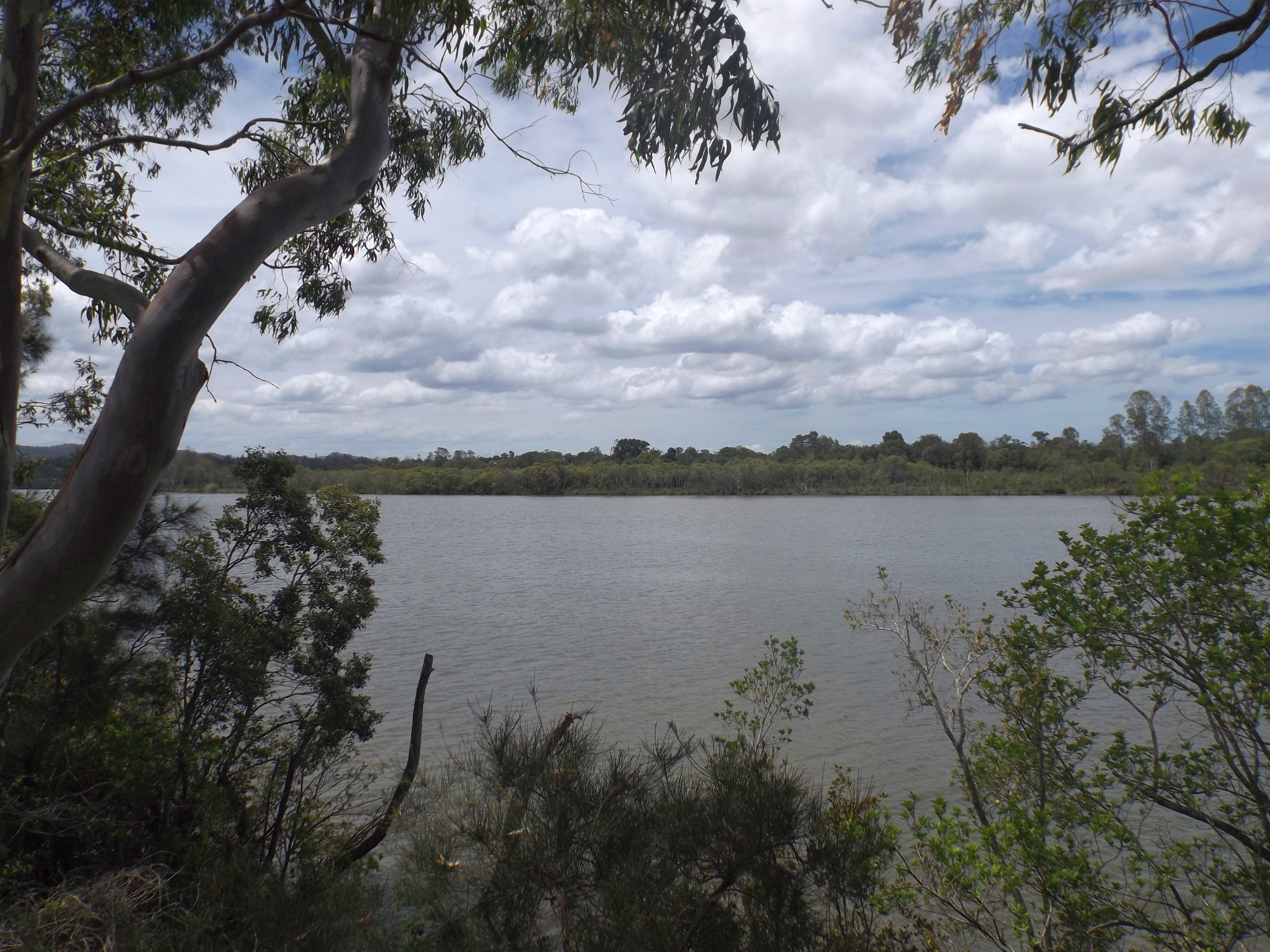
- Island seen from across the Brisbane River in Graceville, 2014

- Location within Queensland
- Location: Queensland
- Nearest city: Indooroopilly
- Coordinates: 27°30′58″S 152°59′24″E
- Area: 0.06 km^{2} (0.023 sq mi)
- Established: 1995
- Governing body: Queensland Parks and Wildlife Service
- Website: Official website

The Indooroopilly Island Conservation Park is a protected conservation park that is located on an island in the Brisbane River, in Brisbane, Queensland, Australia. The 6.34-hectare (15.7-acre) island park is the site of one of Australia's largest flying fox colonies, located 7 kilometres (4.3 mi) west of the Brisbane central business district near the suburb of Indooroopilly.

Vegetation on the island consists of two species of mangroves and forest red gum eucalyptus trees. Weeds pose a threat to the ecology of the island and the survival of the flying fox colony. In summer, the island may contain as many as several hundred thousand flying foxes. Other species include several species of birds, including bush turkeys, as well as snakes. The island is significant to the local Aboriginal people, the Yugara people.

== See also ==
- Protected areas of Queensland
