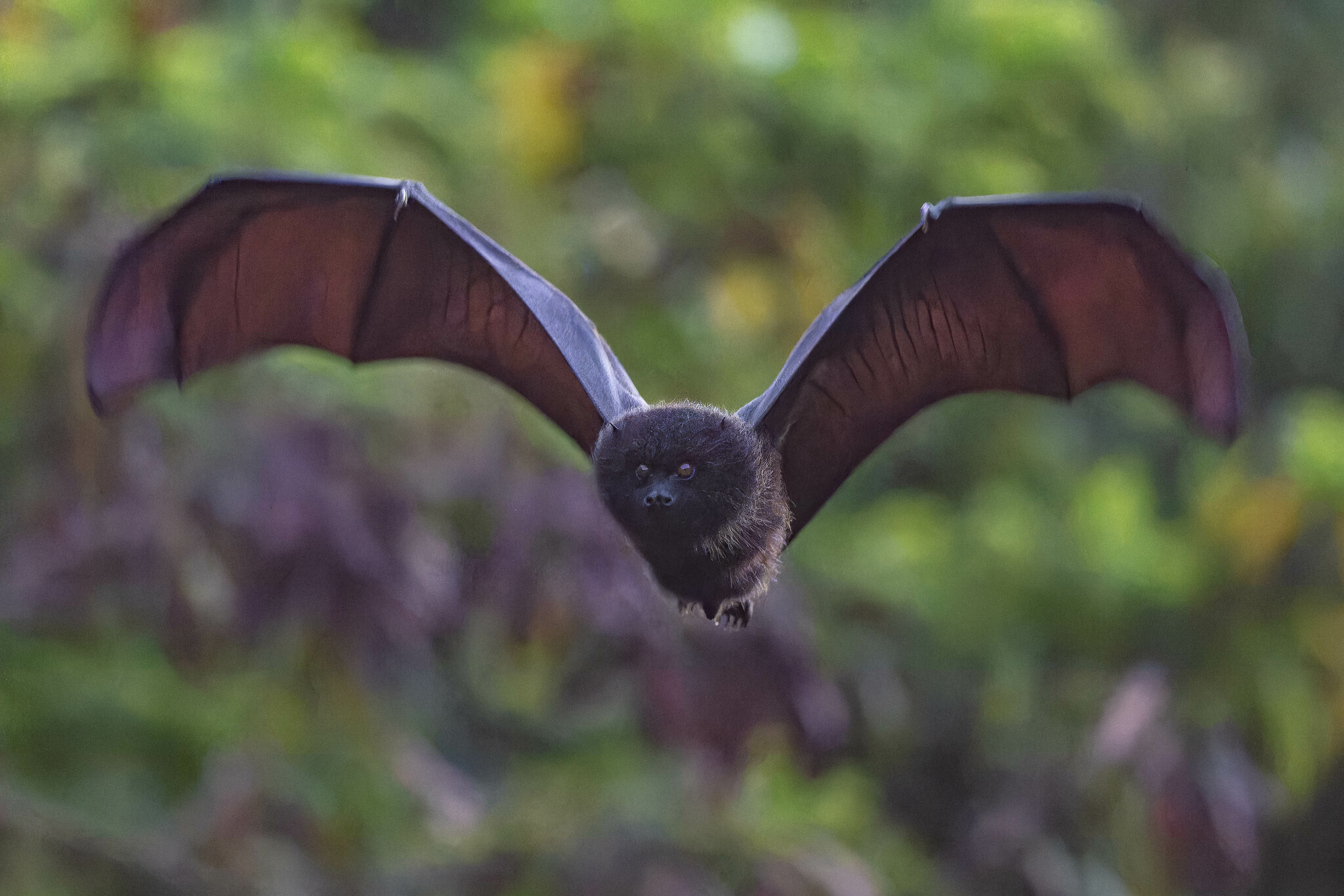

Conservation status
- Endangered (IUCN 3.1)

Scientific classification
- Kingdom: Animalia
- Phylum: Chordata
- Class: Mammalia
- Order: Chiroptera
- Family: Pteropodidae
- Genus: Pteropus
- Species: P. pselaphon

Binomial name
- Pteropus pselaphon Lay, 1829
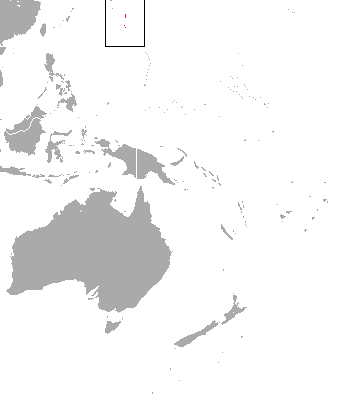
- Bonin flying fox range

= Bonin flying fox =

Species of bat

The Bonin flying fox (Pteropus pselaphon), also known as Bonin fruit bat, is a species of flying fox in the family Pteropodidae. It is endemic to four islands (Chichijima, Hahajima, North Iwo Jima, and South Iwo Jima) of the Bonin Islands group, Japan. Its natural habitat is subtropical forests. It is threatened by habitat loss.

== Etymology ==
The Bonin flying fox was described by British naturalist George Tradescant Lay in 1829. He gave it the species name pselaphon as a reference to "the habit of feeling instead of seeing its way in the day time." Pselaphon is a Neo-Latin word from Ancient Greek psēlaphan 'to grope about'.

== Taxonomy ==
As the Pteropus genus is quite speciose, it is traditionally divided into closely related species groups, identified based on morphology. Traditionally, the Bonin flying fox has been the identifier of the pselaphon species group, of which there are several other members:

- the extinct large Palau flying fox
- Vanikoro flying fox
- the extinct Guam flying fox
- New Caledonia flying fox
- Chuuk flying fox
- White-winged flying fox

However, adding in phylogenetic data places this species in a different group—the vampyrus group— which consists of:

- Bonin flying fox
- Ryukyu flying fox
- Little golden-mantled flying fox
- Rodrigues flying fox
- Large flying fox
- Indian flying fox
- Lyle's flying fox
- Aldabra flying fox
- Madagascan flying fox
- Seychelles fruit bat
- Mauritian flying fox

== Description ==
Their fur is predominantly black and brown, with silver-tipped hairs interspersed. Their uropatagium is almost completely furred across the dorsal side, but about half furred on its ventral side. The fur along the body is smooth but is frizzled around the head, neck, and shoulders. They have scroll-like nostrils. From their nose to the tip of the uropatagium, they are 254 mm (10.0 in) long. Their wingspan is 787 mm (31.0 in). Their forearms are 132–143 mm (5.2–5.6 in) long. They weigh 403–587 g (14.2–20.7 oz). Young bats (pups) have forearm lengths of less than 125 mm (4.9 in). In captivity, they can live at least 16 years.

== Biology ==
=== Diet ===
This species is herbivorous. They eat fruits of the Manilkara genus and the Pandanus genus, including screw-pine and thatch screwpine. When eating a piece of fruit, they will suck out the juices and discard the rest instead of consuming it entirely. They consume ornamental plants including Agave americana. They are also known to eat ferns, based on the presence of Asplenium spores in their guano. Other components of their diet include soursop fruit, sugar-apples, banana fruits, leaves, and flowers, traveller's palm flowers, giant white bird of paradise flowers, pitahaya fruit, Indian-almond fruit, Java apple fruit and flowers, guava fruit, weeping paperbark flowers, Albany bottlebrush flowers, litchi fruit, key lime fruits, Meyer lemons, pomelos, grapefruit, amanatsu fruit, sweet oranges, tangerines, mangos, figs, and Chinese mulberries.

=== Behavior ===
When foraging, they move slowly through the trees. In the summer, individuals roost alone rather than in colonies. In the winter, their colonies form unique, ball-shaped dense clusters during the daytime to conserve body heat. Their winter colonies can have as many as 100 individuals. Bonin flying foxes do not have a strong fear of humans. Bonin flying foxes are an animal species known to display homosexual behavior, with males observed performing fellatio on other males. This behavior occurs independently of social grooming, and one possible explanation for it is that it promotes colony formation for warmth among males who would otherwise repel each other during competition for females.

=== Reproduction ===
Copulation is frequent in winter colonies, with as many as 27 instances observed per day in colonies with large proportions of female bats. During mating, the bats screech loudly, and males will lick the female's vulva. This species probably has the ability to breed year-round. Gestation is estimated at 5–7 months, after which the female gives birth to one pup. Pups are most frequently seen in August, though they have been observed in February, March, April, and December as well.

== Range and habitat ==
It is one of the northernmost species of flying foxes. It is endemic to the Bonin Islands of Japan, including Chichijima and Hahajima; and the Iwo Islands, including North Iwo Jima, Iwo Jima, and South Iwo Jima. They live in subtropical habitat. The islands where they are found have many steep hills

== Conservation ==
In 1994 and 1996, the Bonin flying fox was classified as vulnerable by the IUCN. In 2000, the classification was revised to critically endangered. In 2017, they were downlisted to endangered. They are considered endangered because their extent of occurrence is less than 100 km^{2} (39 mi^{2}), their habitat is severely fragmented, and the population is estimated at fewer than 250 mature individuals. In 1969, this species was listed as a Natural Monument of Japan. This law made it illegal to capture or hunt them. The population of bats Chichijima Island was estimated at 150 individuals in 1997, but by 2002, it was estimated at only 65-80 individuals. Possible reasons for their decline include entanglement in agricultural nets and depredation by feral cats. It is speculated that they are threatened by competition with invasive species, including rats, white-eyes, and honey bees.

=== In captivity ===
This species has been kept at Tama Zoological Park in Tokyo in the past. One individual died in 1998 and another in 1999, and it is unclear if the species is still kept there or if there are attempts at a captive breeding program.
