= C17orf50 =

Protein-coding gene in the species Homo sapiens

Identifiers
- Aliases: C17orf50, chromosome 17 open reading frame 50
- External IDs: MGI: 1913580; HomoloGene: 11949; GeneCards: C17orf50; OMA:C17orf50 - orthologs

Gene location (Human)
| Chr. | Chromosome 17 (human) |
| Band | 17q12 | Start | 35,760,887 bp |
| Band | 17q12 | End | 35,765,079 bp |

Gene location (Mouse)
| Chr. | Chromosome 11 (mouse) |
| Band | 11|11 C | Start | 83,328,503 bp |
| Band | 11|11 C | End | 83,332,059 bp |
RNA expression pattern
| Bgee | Human / Mouse (ortholog); Top expressed in: left testis; right testis; sperm; testicle; sural nerve; right uterine tube; nucleus accumbens; mucosa of nose; olfactory zone of nasal mucosa; putamen / Top expressed in: spermatid; granulocyte; morula; esophagus; spermatocyte; embryo; lip; embryo; muscle of thigh; yolk sac; More reference expression data |
| BioGPS | n/a |
Orthologs
| Species | Human | Mouse |
| Entrez | 146853 | 66330 |
| Ensembl | ENSG00000270806 | ENSMUSG00000035085 |
| UniProt | Q8WW18 | Q8C1R3 |
| RefSeq (mRNA) | NM_145272 | NM_025492 |
| RefSeq (protein) | NP_660315 | NP_079768 |
| Location (UCSC) | Chr 17: 35.76 – 35.77 Mb | Chr 11: 83.33 – 83.33 Mb |
| PubMed search |
- Wikidata
| View/Edit Human | View/Edit Mouse |

Uncharacterized protein C17orf50 is a protein which in humans is encoded by the C17orf50 gene.

== Gene ==
The gene is located on the long arm of chromosome 17 on the forward strand at position 17q12. C17orf50 spans 4,200 base pairs from 35,760,897 to 35,765,079. In humans, this gene encodes a protein that is 174 amino acids in length and has three exons.

=== Regulation of transcription ===
The promoter region for C17orf50 is 1417 base pairs long with an accession number of GXP_123003 from Genomatix. The first half of the promoter is poorly conserved even among primates.

There are many binding sites for transcription factors found in the brain and embryonic tissue, particularly Brn-5 POU domain factor, which has three binding sites within the conserved region of the promoter. This transcription factor is expressed in layer IV of the neocortex of adults and at its highest levels in the developing brain and spinal cord.

Annotated promoter sequence of C17orf50 showing possible transcription factor binding sites and conserved regions

== Homology/evolution ==
Orthologs of this gene exist in eukaryotes, predominantly in mammals. However, some homologs are present in birds, reptiles, and amphibians. There are no paralogs of this gene. The table below shows a short list of orthologs to trace the evolutionary history of C17orf50.

| Species | Accession number | Divergence from humans (MYA) | Identity |
|---|---|---|---|
| Homo sapiens | NP_660315 | 0 | 100% |
| Chlorocebus sabaeus | XP_008009267 | 29.44 | 85% |
| Mus musculus | NP_079768.2 | 90 | 68% |
| Pteropus vampyrus | XP_011385558 | 171 | 70% |
| Chelonia mydas | EMP28888 | 312 | 45% |
| Corvus brachyrhynchos | XP_017584321 | 312 | 44% |
| Anolis carolinensis | XP_003218353 | 312 | 37% |
| Xenopus tropicalis | OCA35560 | 352 | 46% |

The most distant ortholog found diverged from humans approximately 352 million years ago, indicating that the protein arose shortly before that. When compared to other proteins, namely cytochrome c and fibrinogen alpha chain, uncharacterized protein C17orf50 is a rapidly evolving protein.

== Expression ==
C17orf50 is expressed at low levels in various tissues, such as lung, prostate, thymus, thyroid, trachea, small intestine, and stomach, and it is most highly expressed in the fetal brain.

== Protein ==
The unmodified molecular weight of C17orf50 protein is 19.3 kilodaltons. The protein has a negative charge cluster from position 21 to 52; this is a glutamate-rich region. There are three nuclear localization signals with no other retention signals, strongly indicating that the protein is localized to the nucleus.

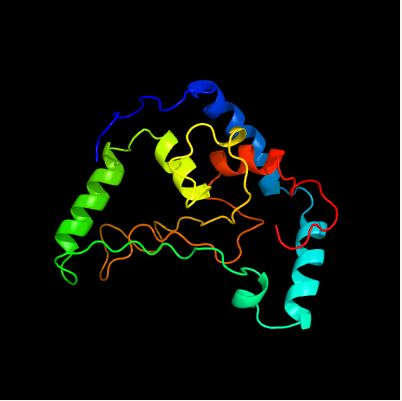

=== Domains ===
Uncharacterized protein C17orf50 contains a domain of unknown function (DUF4637) from position 5 to 172, which makes up the majority of the protein.

=== Post-translational modifications ===
Uncharacterized protein C17orf50 contains two potential sumoylation sites at K7 and K12. There are possible threonine and serine glycosylation sites throughout the protein. Potential threonine, serine, and tyrosine phosphorylation sites are also present.

Annotated conceptual translation C17orf50

=== Interacting proteins ===
Uncharacterized protein C17orf50 has potential interactions with zinc finger protein 587(ZNF587), which is expressed throughout fetal tissue, including the brain, ZNF587 is expected to regulate transcription.
