= Glyphodes shafferorum =

Scientific classification
- Kingdom: Animalia
- Phylum: Arthropoda
- Clade: Pancrustacea
- Class: Insecta
- Order: Lepidoptera
- Family: Crambidae
- Genus: Glyphodes
- Species: G. shafferorum

Binomial name
- Glyphodes shafferorum Viette, 1987

Species of moth

Glyphodes shafferorum is a moth of the family Crambidae described by Pierre Viette in 1987. It is found on the Comoros, Réunion, Madagascar and in Mauritius and South Africa. Their wingspan is about 20–30 mm.

The larvae feed on Ficus species, including F. carica, F. reflexa, F. rubra and F. benghalensis.
