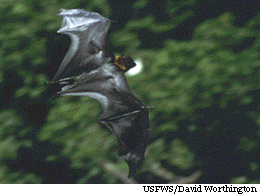

Conservation status
- Extinct (1970s) (IUCN 3.1)

Scientific classification
- Kingdom: Animalia
- Phylum: Chordata
- Class: Mammalia
- Order: Chiroptera
- Family: Pteropodidae
- Genus: Pteropus
- Species: †P. tokudae

Binomial name
- †Pteropus tokudae Tate, 1934
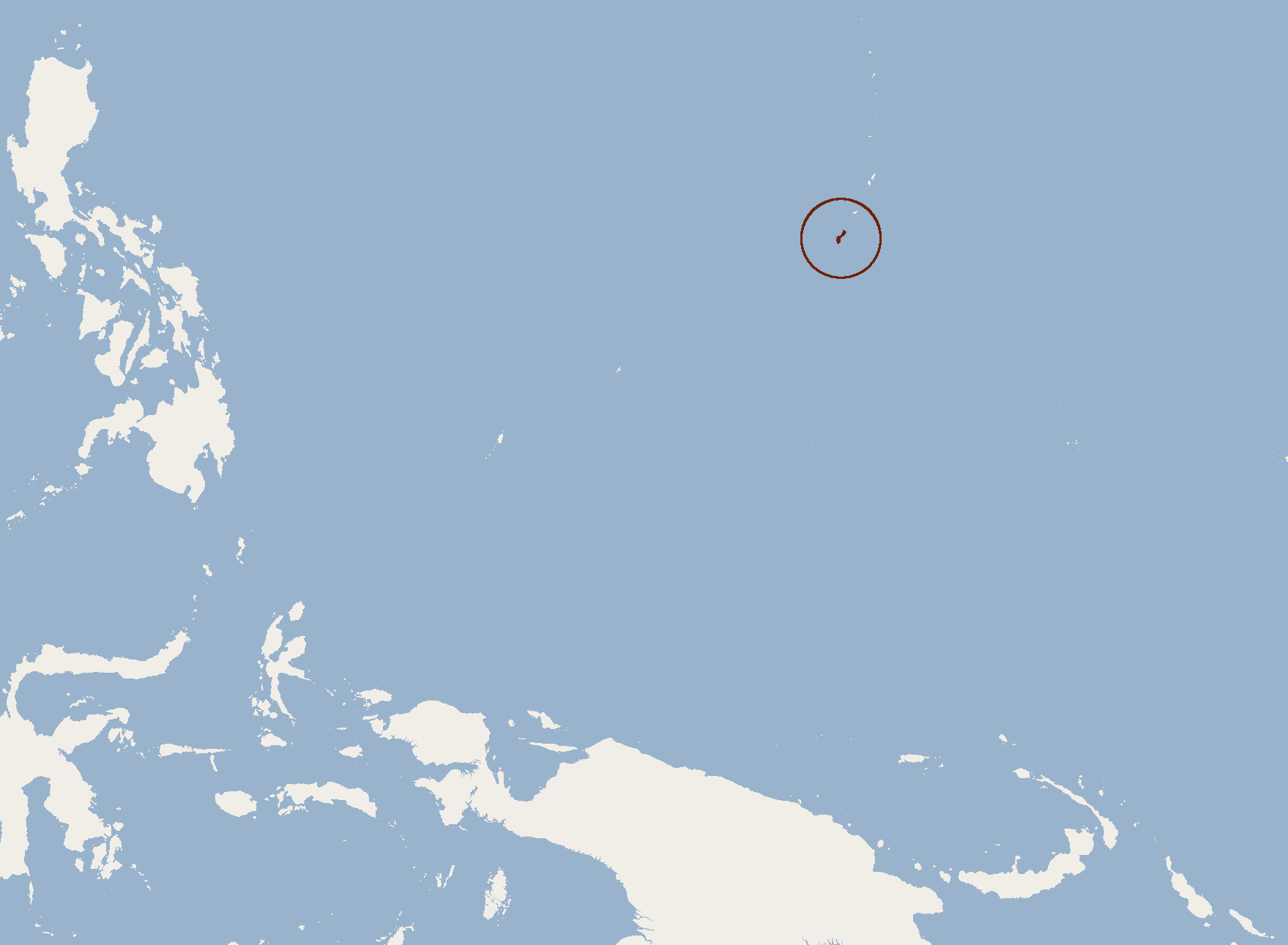

= Guam flying fox =

Extinct species of bat

The Guam flying fox (Pteropus tokudae), also known as the little Marianas fruit bat, is an extinct species of small megabat endemic to Guam in the Marianas Islands in Micronesia that was confirmed extinct due to hunting or habitat changes. It was first recorded in 1931 and was observed roosting with the larger and much more common Mariana fruit bat. The last specimen was a female found roosting at Tarague cliff in March 1967, but it escaped capture. An unconfirmed sighting took place sometime during the 1970s, and no other individuals have been sighted since then.

== Description ==
The Guam flying fox had a length of about 15 cm (6 in), a wingspan of about 70 cm (28 in), and a body weight of 152 g (5.4 oz). It was very similar in appearance to the Chuuk flying fox (Pteropus insularis). The top of the head was greyish, while its back, throat, and underparts were brown or dark brown, and the side of the neck was golden-brown.

== Behaviour ==
Little is known about the behaviour of this flying fox, but it is likely that it fed on the fruits, flowers, and foliage of evergreen shrubs and trees that are characteristic of the limestone forests found in the northern part of Guam. Similarly, not much is known about its reproductive habits, but an incident in 1968, where a female was shot, revealed that she was accompanied by an immature individual. This suggests the possibility of ongoing parental care.

== Status ==
There are no confirmed records of sightings of this bat since the 1970s and the IUCN lists it as being "Extinct". The guam flying fox was last seen in 1967 and it was declared extinct in the wild in 1976. The guam flying fox was declared extinct by the IUCN Red List in 2004. When it was more plentiful, it was hunted by humans for food, which may have contributed to its extinction. Another factor may have been the introduction, into the island, of the predatory brown tree snake (Boiga irregularis). In September 2021, the U.S. Fish and Wildlife Service proposed declaring the species extinct, and it was delisted effective November 2023 in accordance with the Endangered Species Act.
