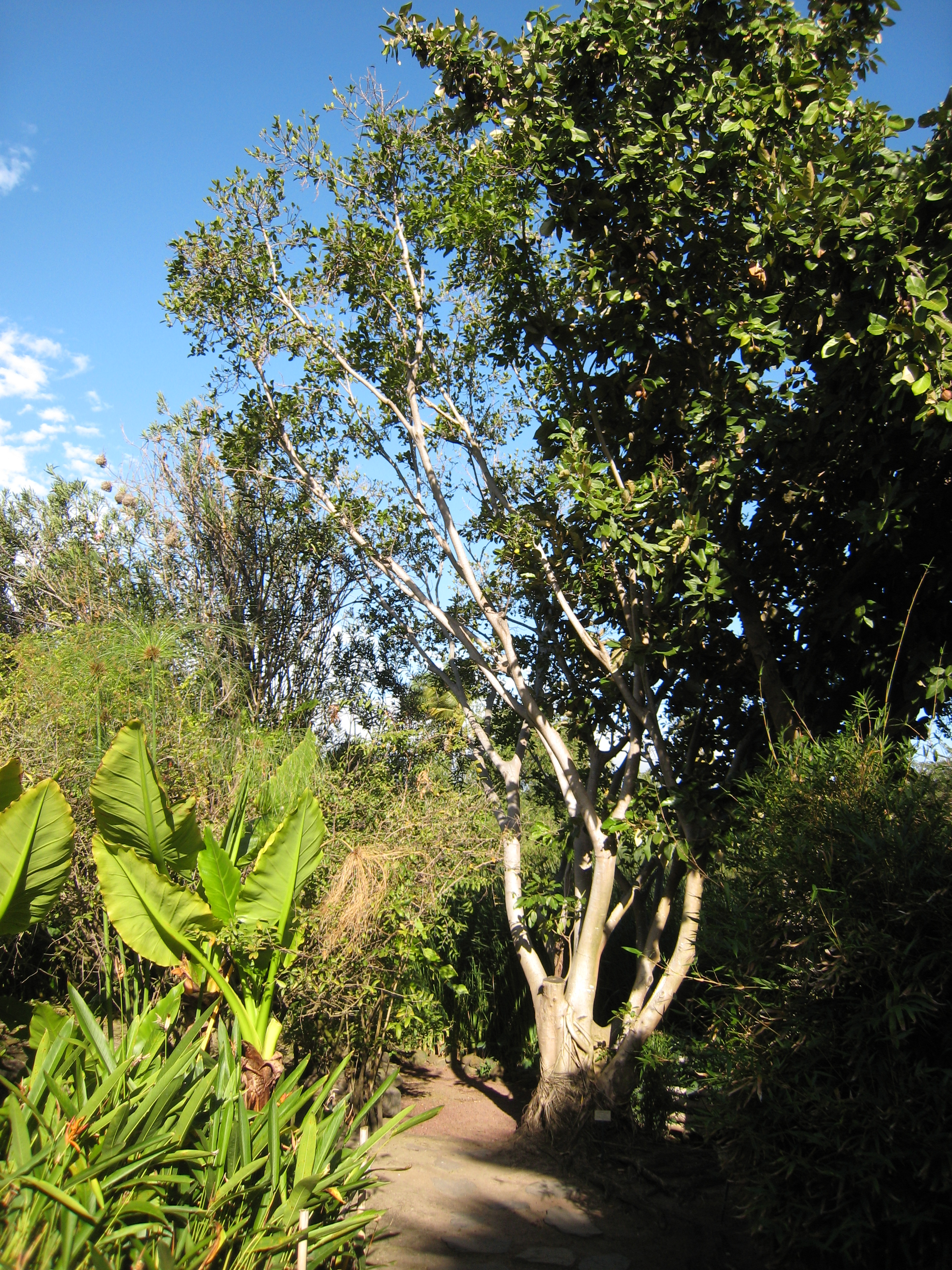

Conservation status
- Least Concern (IUCN 3.1)

Scientific classification
- Kingdom: Plantae
- Clade: Tracheophytes
- Clade: Angiosperms
- Clade: Eudicots
- Clade: Rosids
- Order: Rosales
- Family: Moraceae
- Genus: Ficus
- Species: F. rubra

Binomial name
- Ficus rubra Vahl, 1805

Synonyms
- Ficus avi-avi Chapel. ex Bojer; Ficus cinerea Cordem.; Ficus consimilis Baker; Ficus pyrifolia Lam., nom. illeg. homonym. post.; Ficus pyrifolia var. consimilis (Baker) H.Perrier; Urostigma rubrum (Vahl) Miq.

= Ficus rubra =

Species of flowering plant

Ficus rubra (a.k.a. red affouche or affouche rouge) is a species of flowering plant in the family of Moraceae. It is a tree native to Madagascar and other islands in the western Indian Ocean.

It is found in Madagascar, Comoros, Mauritius, Réunion, Rodrigues, and Seychelles. It also has been introduced to Kauai island (Hawaiʻi).

Pollinator of this plant is the wasp Nigeriella avicola Wiebes.

On Kauai island, Port Jackson fig wasps (Pleistodontes imperialis) are able to do the job as substitute pollinators.
