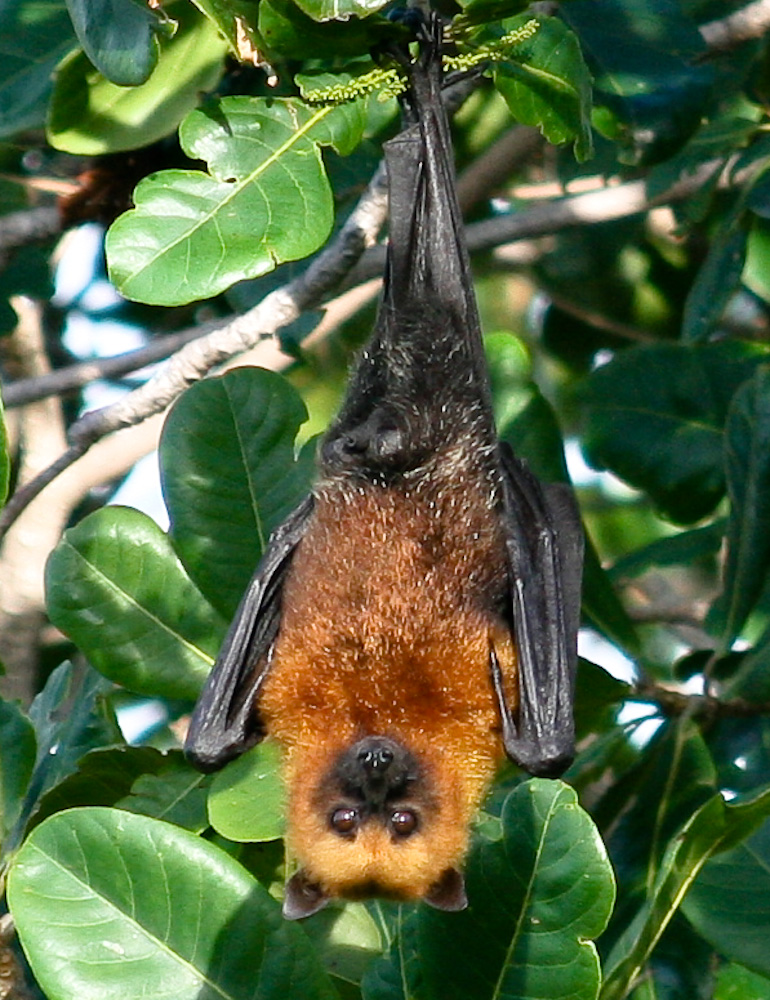

Conservation status
- Least Concern (IUCN 3.1)

Scientific classification
- Domain: Eukaryota
- Kingdom: Animalia
- Phylum: Chordata
- Class: Mammalia
- Order: Chiroptera
- Family: Pteropodidae
- Genus: Pteropus
- Species: P. seychellensis

Binomial name
- Pteropus seychellensis Kerr, 1792
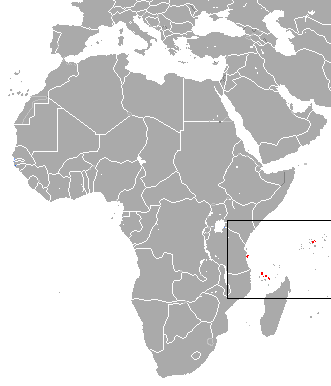
- Seychelles fruit bat range

= Seychelles fruit bat =

Species of bat

The Seychelles fruit bat or Seychelles flying fox (Pteropus seychellensis) is a megabat found on the granitic islands of Seychelles, and on the Comoros and Mafia Island. It is a significant component of the ecosystems for the islands, dispersing the seeds of many tree species. Although it is hunted for meat on some islands, it remains abundant. It is particularly common on Silhouette Island.
