= List of pteropodids =

Species in mammal family Pteropodidae

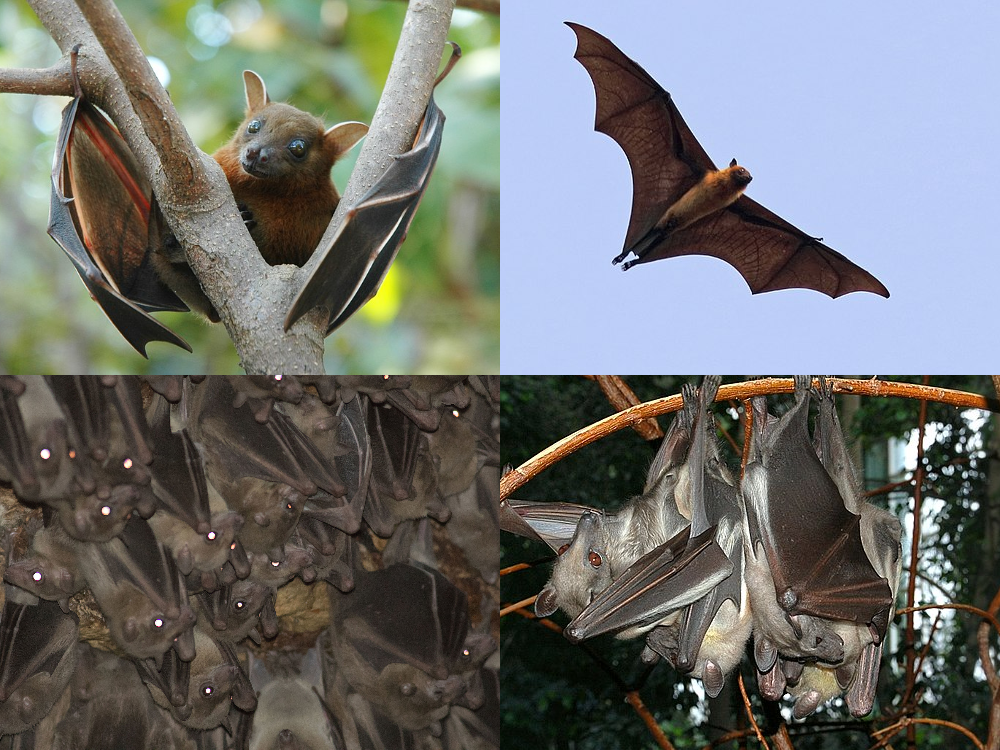
From top-left, clockwise: greater short-nosed fruit bat (Cynopterus sphinx), Indian flying fox (Pteropus medius), straw-coloured fruit bats (Eidolon helvum), and Egyptian fruit bats (Rousettus aegyptiacus)

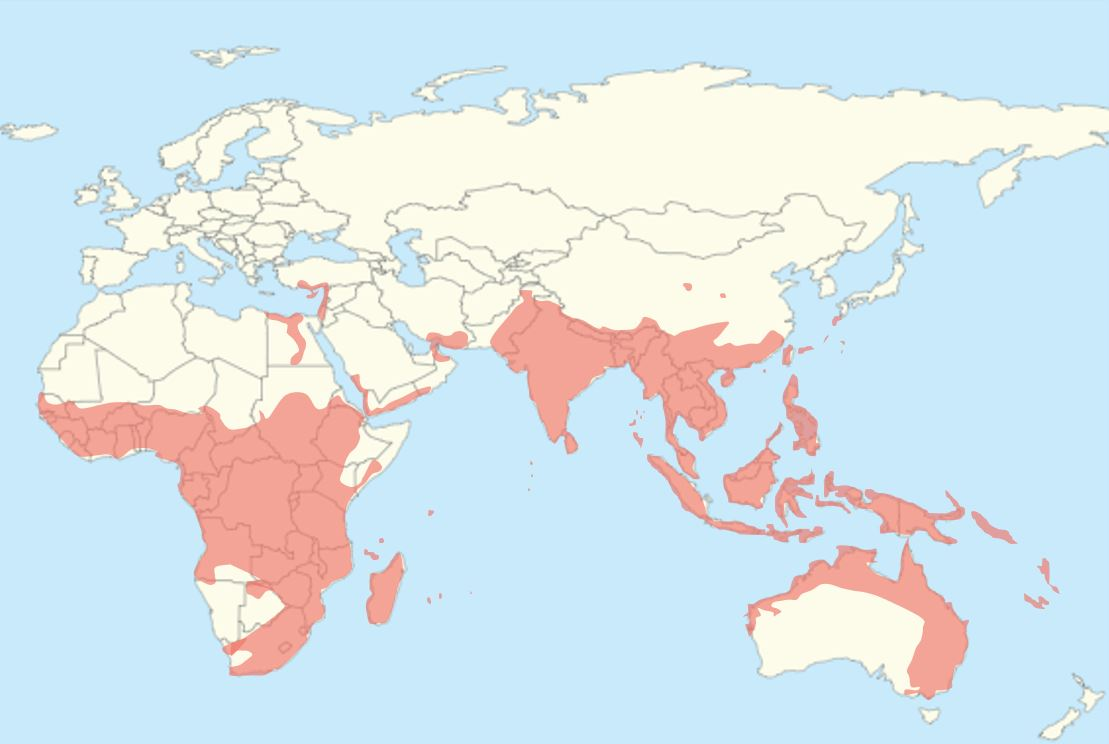
Distribution of pteropodids

Pteropodidae is one of the twenty families of bats in the mammalian order Chiroptera and part of the Yinpterochiroptera suborder. Members of this family are called pteropodids, fruit bats, flying foxes, or megabats. They are found in Africa, Asia, and Australia, primarily in forests and caves, though some can be found in savannas, shrublands, wetlands, and rocky areas. They range in size from the long-tongued nectar bat, at 4 cm (2 in) plus a minute tail, to the great flying fox, at 37 cm (15 in) with no tail. Like all bats, pteropodids are capable of true and sustained flight, and have forearm lengths ranging from 3 cm (1 in) for several species to 23 cm (9 in) for the large flying fox, which has an overall wingspan of up to 1.7 m (5.6 ft). Most species primarily or exclusively eat fruit, though the ten species of the subfamily Macroglossusinae primarily eat pollen and nectar and the sixteen species of the genus Nyctimene sometimes eat insects. Most pteropodids do not have population estimates, though six species have been driven extinct in modern times: the Guam flying fox, large Palau flying fox, large Samoan flying fox, Percy Island flying fox, small Mauritian flying fox, and small Samoan flying fox, 29 species are categorized as endangered species, and 7 species are categorized as critically endangered: Bulmer's fruit bat, Philippine naked-backed fruit bat, Fijian monkey-faced bat, greater monkey-faced bat, montane monkey-faced bat, Aru flying fox, and Ontong Java flying fox, with populations as low as 50 or fewer.

The 198 extant species of Pteropodidae are divided into seven subfamilies: Cynopterinae, with 31 species in 15 genera; Eidolinae, with 2 species in a single genus; Harpyionycterinae, with 18 species in 4 genera; Nyctimeninae, with 18 species in 2 genera; Pteropodinae, with 76 species in 7 genera plus 6 extinct species; Rousettinae, with 41 species in 13 genera; and Macroglossusinae, with 12 species in 5 genera. Several extinct prehistoric pteropodid species have been discovered, though due to ongoing research and discoveries the exact number and categorization is not fixed.

== Conventions ==
IUCN Red List categories
Conservation status
- EX: Extinct (6 species)
- EW: Extinct in the wild (0 species)
- CR: Critically endangered (7 species)
- EN: Endangered (29 species)
- VU: Vulnerable (35 species)
- NT: Near threatened (20 species)
- LC: Least concern (88 species)

Other categories
- DD: Data deficient (14 species)
- NE: Not evaluated (5 species)

The author citation for the species or genus is given after the scientific name; parentheses around the author citation indicate that this was not the original taxonomic placement. Conservation status codes listed follow the International Union for Conservation of Nature (IUCN) Red List of Threatened Species. Range maps are provided wherever possible; if a range map is not available, a description of the pteropodid's range is provided. Ranges are based on the IUCN Red List for that species unless otherwise noted. All extinct species or subspecies listed alongside extant species went extinct after 1500 CE, and are indicated by a dagger symbol "†".

== Classification ==
The family Pteropodidae consists of 198 extant species in seven subfamilies: Eidolinae, Harpyionycterinae, Nyctimeninae, Pteropodinae, Rousettinae, and Macroglossusinae. There are additionally six species that have been made extinct in the modern era in Pteropodinae.

Family Pteropodidae

- Subfamily Cynopterinae
  - Genus Aethalops (sooty bats): two species
  - Genus Alionycteris (Mindanao pygmy fruit bat): one species
  - Genus Balionycteris (spotted-winged fruit bats): two species
  - Genus Chironax (black-capped fruit bats): two species
  - Genus Cynopterus (short-nosed fruit bats): seven species
  - Genus Dyacopterus (dyak fruit bats): three species
  - Genus Haplonycteris (Fischer's pygmy fruit bat): one species
  - Genus Latidens (Salim Ali's fruit bat): one species
  - Genus Megaerops (tailless fruit bats): four species
  - Genus Otopteropus (Luzon fruit bat): one species
  - Genus Penthetor (dusky fruit bat): one species
  - Genus Ptenochirus (musky fruit bats): three species
  - Genus Sphaerias (Blanford's fruit bat): one species
  - Genus Thoopterus (swift fruit bats): two species
- Subfamily Eidolinae
  - Genus Eidolon (palm bats): two species
- Subfamily Harpyionycterinae
  - Genus Aproteles (Bulmer's fruit bat): one species
  - Genus Boneia (Manado fruit bat): one species
  - Genus Dobsonia (naked-backed fruit bats): fourteen species
  - Genus Harpyionycteris (harpy fruit bats): two species
- Subfamily Macroglossusinae
  - Genus Macroglossus (long-tongued fruit bats): two species
  - Genus Melonycteris (black-bellied fruit bat): one species
  - Genus Nesonycteris (Solomon Islands blossom bats): four species
  - Genus Notopteris (long-tailed blossom bats): two species
  - Genus Syconycteris (blossom bats): one species
- Subfamily Nyctimeninae
  - Genus Nyctimene (tube-nosed fruit bats): sixteen species
  - Genus Paranyctimene (lesser tube-nosed fruit bats): two species
- Subfamily Pteropodinae
  - Genus Acerodon (sharp-toothed flying foxes): five species
  - Genus Desmalopex (white-winged flying foxes): two species
  - Genus Mirimiri (Fijian monkey-faced bat): one species
  - Genus Neopteryx (small-toothed fruit bat): one species
  - Genus Pteralopex (monkey-faced bats): five species
  - Genus Pteropus (flying foxes): sixty-six species (six extinct)
  - Genus Styloctenium (stripe-faced fruit bats): two species
- Subfamily Rousettinae
  - Genus Casinycteris (short-palated bats): three species
  - Genus Eonycteris (dawn bats): three species
  - Genus Epomophorus (epauletted bats): eleven species
  - Genus Epomops (epauletted fruit bats): two species
  - Genus Hypsignathus (hammer-headed bat): one species
  - Genus Megaloglossus (long-tongued fruit bats): two species
  - Genus Myonycteris (collared fruit bats): five species
  - Genus Nanonycteris (Veldkamp's dwarf epauletted fruit bat): one species
  - Genus Pilonycteris (Sulawesi rousette): one species
  - Genus Plerotes (D'Anchieta's fruit bat): one species
  - Genus Rousettus (rousettes): seven species
  - Genus Scotonycteris (tear-drop bats): three species
  - Genus Stenonycteris (long-haired fruit bat): one species

- Pteropodidae
  - Cynopterinae
  - - - - Harpyionycterinae
        - Macroglossusinae
      - Rousettinae
    - - Eidolinae
      - - Nyctimeninae
        - Pteropodinae

== Pteropodids ==
The following classification is based on the taxonomy described by the reference work Mammal Species of the World (2005), with augmentation by generally accepted proposals made since using molecular phylogenetic analysis, as supported by both the IUCN SSC Bat Specialist Group and the American Society of Mammalogists.

=== Subfamily Cynopterinae ===
Genus Aethalops – Thomas, 1923 – two species
Common name	Scientific name and subspecies	Range	Size and ecology	IUCN status and estimated population
Borneo fruit bat	A. aequalis Allen, 1938	Northern island of Borneo	Size: 5–7 cm (2–3 in) long, with no tail 4–5 cm (2 in) forearm length Habitat: Forest and caves	LC Unknown
Pygmy fruit bat	A. alecto (Thomas, 1923) Three subspecies: A. a. alecto; A. a. boeadii; A. a. ocypete	Southeastern Asia	Size: 6–8 cm (2–3 in) long, with no tail 4–5 cm (2 in) forearm length Habitat: Forest	LC Unknown

Genus Alionycteris – Kock, 1969 – one species
Common name	Scientific name and subspecies	Range	Size and ecology	IUCN status and estimated population
Mindanao pygmy fruit bat	A. paucidentata Kock, 1969	Philippines	Size: 6–8 cm (2–3 in) long, with no tail 4–5 cm (2 in) forearm length Habitat: Forest	LC Unknown

Genus Balionycteris – Matschie, 1899 – two species
Common name	Scientific name and subspecies	Range	Size and ecology	IUCN status and estimated population
Malayan spotted-winged fruit bat	B. seimundi Kloss, 1921	Malaysia	Size: 5–7 cm (2–3 in) long, with no tail 4–5 cm (2 in) forearm length Habitat: Forest	LC Unknown
Spotted-winged fruit bat	B. maculata (Thomas, 1893) Two subspecies: B. m. maculata; B. m. seimundi	Southeastern Asia	Size: 5–8 cm (2–3 in) long, with no tail 3–5 cm (1–2 in) forearm length Habitat: Forest	LC Unknown

Genus Chironax – K. Andersen, 1912 – two species
Common name	Scientific name and subspecies	Range	Size and ecology	IUCN status and estimated population
Black-capped fruit bat	C. melanocephalus (Temminck, 1825)	Southeastern Asia	Size: 5–8 cm (2–3 in) long, with no tail 4–5 cm (2 in) forearm length Habitat: Forest and caves	LC Unknown
Sulawesi black-capped fruit bat	C. tumulus Bergmans & Rozendaal, 1988	Indonesia	Size: About 6 cm (2 in) long, with no tail 4–5 cm (2 in) forearm length Habitat: Forest and caves	NE Unknown

Genus Cynopterus – F. Cuvier, 1824 – seven species
Common name	Scientific name and subspecies	Range	Size and ecology	IUCN status and estimated population
Greater short-nosed fruit bat	C. sphinx (Vahl, 1797) Six subspecies: C. s. angulatus; C. s. babi; C. s. pagensis; C. s. scherzeri; C. s. serasani; C. s. sphinx	Southern and southeastern Asia	Size: 8–11 cm (3–4 in) long, plus 1–2 cm (0.4–0.8 in) tail 6–8 cm (2–3 in) forearm length Habitat: Forest	LC Unknown
Horsfield's fruit bat	C. horsfieldii Gray, 1843 Four subspecies: C. h. harpax; C. h. horsfieldii; C. h. persimilis; C. h. princeps	Southeastern Asia	Size: 8–12 cm (3–5 in) long, plus 1–2 cm (0.4–0.8 in) tail 6–9 cm (2–4 in) forearm length Habitat: Forest and caves	LC Unknown
Indonesian short-nosed fruit bat	C. titthaecheilus (Temminck, 1825) Three subspecies: C. t. major; C. t. terminus; C. t. titthaecheilus	Southeastern Asia	Size: 11–13 cm (4–5 in) long, plus 0.5–2 cm (0.2–0.8 in) tail 7–9 cm (3–4 in) forearm length Habitat: Forest	LC Unknown
Lesser short-nosed fruit bat	C. brachyotis (Müller, 1838) Eight subspecies: C. b. altitudinis; C. b. brachyotis; C. b. brachysoma; C. b. ceylonensis; C. b. concolor; C. b. hoffeti; C. b. insularum; C. b. javanicus	Southern and southeastern Asia	Size: 7–10 cm (3–4 in) long, plus 1–2 cm (0.4–0.8 in) tail 5–7 cm (2–3 in) forearm length Habitat: Forest	LC Unknown
Minute fruit bat	C. minutus Miller, 1906	Southeastern Asia	Size: 7–9 cm (3–4 in) long, plus 1–2 cm (0.4–0.8 in) tail 5–6 cm (2 in) forearm length Habitat: Forest	LC Unknown
Nusatenggara short-nosed fruit bat	C. nusatenggara Kitchener & Maharadatunkamsi, 1991 Three subspecies: C. n. nusatenggara; C. n. sinagai; C. n. wetarensis	Indonesia	Size: About 9 cm (4 in) long, plus about 0.5 cm (0.2 in) tail 5–7 cm (2–3 in) forearm length Habitat: Forest	LC Unknown
Peters's fruit bat	C. luzoniensis (Peters, 1861)	Southeastern Asia	Size: 9–11 cm (4 in) long, plus 0.5–2 cm (0.20–0.79 in) tail 5–7 cm (2–3 in) forearm length Habitat: Forest	LC Unknown

Genus Dyacopterus – K. Andersen, 1912 – three species
Common name	Scientific name and subspecies	Range	Size and ecology	IUCN status and estimated population
Brooks's dyak fruit bat	D. brooksi (Thomas, 1920)	Island of Sumatra	Size: 11–12 cm (4–5 in) long, plus 1–2 cm (0.4–0.8 in) tail 8–9 cm (3–4 in) forearm length Habitat: Forest	VU Unknown
Rickart's dyak fruit bat	D. rickarti (Thomas, 1920)	Philippines	Size: 13–15 cm (5–6 in) long, plus 1–3 cm (0.4–1.2 in) tail 9–10 cm (4–4 in) forearm length Habitat: Forest and caves	EN Unknown
Dayak fruit bat	D. spadiceus (Thomas, 1890)	Southeastern Asia	Size: 10–13 cm (4–5 in) long, plus 1–3 cm (0.4–1.2 in) tail 7–9 cm (3–4 in) forearm length Habitat: Forest and caves	NT Unknown

Genus Haplonycteris – Lawrence, 1939 – one species
Common name	Scientific name and subspecies	Range	Size and ecology	IUCN status and estimated population
Fischer's pygmy fruit bat	H. fischeri Lawrence, 1939	Philippines	Size: 6–8 cm (2–3 in) long, with no tail 4–6 cm (2 in) forearm length Habitat: Forest	LC Unknown

Genus Latidens – Thonglongya, 1972 – one species
Common name	Scientific name and subspecies	Range	Size and ecology	IUCN status and estimated population
Salim Ali's fruit bat	L. salimalii Thonglongya, 1972	Southern India	Size: 10–11 cm (4 in) long, with no tail 6–7 cm (2–3 in) forearm length Habitat: Forest and caves	EN 750

Genus Megaerops – Peters, 1865 – four species
Common name	Scientific name and subspecies	Range	Size and ecology	IUCN status and estimated population
Javan tailless fruit bat	M. kusnotoi Hill & Boeadi, 1978	Indonesia	Size: 5–8 cm (2–3 in) long, with no tail 4–6 cm (2 in) forearm length Habitat: Forest	VU Unknown
Ratanaworabhan's fruit bat	M. niphanae Yenbutra & Felten, 1983	Southeastern Asia	Size: 7–9 cm (3–4 in) long, with no tail 5–7 cm (2–3 in) forearm length Habitat: Forest	LC Unknown
Tailless fruit bat	M. ecaudatus (Temminck, 1837)	Southeastern Asia	Size: 6–9 cm (2–4 in) long, with no tail 5–6 cm (2 in) forearm length Habitat: Forest	LC Unknown
White-collared fruit bat	M. albicollis Francis, 1989	Southeastern Asia	Size: 4–6 cm (2 in) long, plus 0–0.5 cm (0.0–0.2 in) tail 4–6 cm (2 in) forearm length Habitat: Forest	NT Unknown

Genus Otopteropus – Kock, 1969 – one species
Common name	Scientific name and subspecies	Range	Size and ecology	IUCN status and estimated population
Luzon fruit bat	O. cartilagonodus Kock, 1969	Philippines	Size: 6–8 cm (2–3 in) long, with no tail 4–5 cm (2 in) forearm length Habitat: Forest	LC Unknown

Genus Penthetor – K. Andersen, 1912 – one species
Common name	Scientific name and subspecies	Range	Size and ecology	IUCN status and estimated population
Dusky fruit bat	P. lucasi Dobson, 1880	Southeastern Asia	Size: 7–11 cm (3–4 in) long, plus 0.5–2 cm (0.2–0.8 in) tail 5–7 cm (2–3 in) forearm length Habitat: Forest and caves	LC Unknown

Genus Ptenochirus – Peters, 1861 – three species
Common name	Scientific name and subspecies	Range	Size and ecology	IUCN status and estimated population
Greater musky fruit bat	P. jagori (Peters, 1861)	Philippines	Size: 11–13 cm (4–5 in) long, plus 0.5–2 cm (0.2–0.8 in) tail 7–10 cm (3–4 in) forearm length Habitat: Forest	LC Unknown
Lesser musky fruit bat	P. minor Yoshiyuki, 1979	Philippines	Size: 10–12 cm (4–5 in) long, plus 0.5–2 cm (0.2–0.8 in) tail 7–8 cm (3 in) forearm length Habitat: Forest	LC Unknown
Mindanao fruit bat	P. wetmorei Taylor, 1934	Southeastern Asia	Size: 7–8 cm (3 in) long, plus 0.3–0.5 cm (0.1–0.2 in) tail 4–6 cm (2 in) forearm length Habitat: Forest	NT Unknown

Genus Sphaerias – Miller, 1906 – one species
Common name	Scientific name and subspecies	Range	Size and ecology	IUCN status and estimated population
Blanford's fruit bat	S. blanfordi (Thomas, 1891)	Southern and southeastern Asia	Size: 7–9 cm (3–4 in) long, with no tail 5–7 cm (2–3 in) forearm length Habitat: Forest	LC Unknown

Genus Thoopterus – Matschie, 1899 – two species
Common name	Scientific name and subspecies	Range	Size and ecology	IUCN status and estimated population
Suhaniah fruit bat	T. suhaniahae Maryanto, Yani, Prijono, & Wiantoro, 2012	Indonesia	Size: 8–11 cm (3–4 in) long, with no tail 7–9 cm (3–4 in) forearm length Habitat: Forest	LC Unknown
Swift fruit bat	T. nigrescens (Gray, 1870)	Indonesia	Size: 9–12 cm (4–5 in) long, plus about 0.5 cm (0.2 in) tail 7–9 cm (3–4 in) forearm length Habitat: Forest	LC Unknown

=== Subfamily Eidolinae ===
Genus Eidolon – Rafinesque, 1815 – two species
Common name	Scientific name and subspecies	Range	Size and ecology	IUCN status and estimated population
Madagascan fruit bat	E. dupreanum Schlegel & Pollen, 1866	Western Madagascar	Size: 19–21 cm (7–8 in) long, plus 1–3 cm (0.4–1.2 in); 11–14 cm (4–6 in) forearm length Habitat: Forest and caves	VU Unknown
Straw-coloured fruit bat	E. helvum Kerr, 1792 Three subspecies: E. h. annobonensis; E. h. helvum; E. h. sabaeum	Sub-Saharan Africa and western Arabian Peninsula	Size: 15–20 cm (6–8 in) long, plus 1–2 cm (0.4–0.8 in); 11–14 cm (4–6 in) forearm length Habitat: Savanna and forest	NT Unknown

=== Subfamily Harpyionycterinae ===
Genus Aproteles – Menzies, 1977 – one species
Common name	Scientific name and subspecies	Range	Size and ecology	IUCN status and estimated population
Bulmer's fruit bat	A. bulmerae (Menzies, 1977)	New Guinea	Size: About 25 cm (10 in) long, plus 3–4 cm (1–2 in) tail About 17 cm (7 in) forearm length Habitat: Forest and caves	CR 100–200

Genus Boneia – Jentink, 1879 – one species
Common name	Scientific name and subspecies	Range	Size and ecology	IUCN status and estimated population
Manado fruit bat	B. bidens Jentink, 1879	Indonesia	Size: About 19 cm (7 in) long, plus 2–3 cm (1 in) tail 9–11 cm (4 in) forearm length Habitat: Forest and caves	VU Unknown

Genus Dobsonia – Palmer, 1898 – fourteen species
Common name	Scientific name and subspecies	Range	Size and ecology	IUCN status and estimated population
Andersen's naked-backed fruit bat	D. anderseni Thomas, 1914	Papua New Guinea	Size: 15–20 cm (6–8 in) long, plus 2–4 cm (1–2 in) tail 10–13 cm (4–5 in) forearm length Habitat: Caves and forest	LC Unknown
Bare-backed fruit bat	D. moluccensis (Quoy & Gaimard, 1830)	Southeastern Asia and northern Australia	Size: 18–25 cm (7–10 in) long, plus 2–5 cm (1–2 in) tail 12–17 cm (5–7 in) forearm length Habitat: Forest, rocky areas, and caves	LC Unknown
Beaufort's naked-backed fruit bat	D. beauforti Bergmans, 1975	Indonesia	Size: 12–16 cm (5–6 in) long, plus 2–3 cm (1 in) tail 10–12 cm (4–5 in) forearm length Habitat: Forest and caves	LC Unknown
Biak naked-backed fruit bat	D. emersa Bergmans & Sarbini, 1985	Indonesia	Size: 15–17 cm (6–7 in) long, plus 2–3 cm (1 in) tail 11–12 cm (4–5 in) forearm length Habitat: Forest and caves	VU Unknown
Greenish naked-backed fruit bat	D. viridis Heude, 1896	Indonesia	Size: 15–18 cm (6–7 in) long, plus 2–4 cm (1–2 in) tail 10–12 cm (4–5 in) forearm length Habitat: Forest and caves	LC Unknown
Halmahera naked-backed fruit bat	D. crenulata K. Andersen, 1909	Indonesia	Size: 16–20 cm (6–8 in) long, plus 2–4 cm (1–2 in); 11–14 cm (4–6 in) forearm length Habitat: Forest, rocky areas, and caves	LC Unknown
Lesser naked-backed fruit bat	D. minor Dobson, 1879	New Guinea	Size: 10–14 cm (4–6 in) long, plus 0.5–3 cm (0.2–1.2 in) tail 7–10 cm (3–4 in) forearm length Habitat: Forest	LC Unknown
New Britain naked-backed fruit bat	D. praedatrix K. Andersen, 1909	Island of New Britain	Size: 11–18 cm (4–7 in) long, plus 2–4 cm (1–2 in); 10–13 cm (4–5 in) forearm length Habitat: Forest and caves	LC Unknown
New Guinea naked-backed fruit bat	D. magna Thomas, 1905	Southeastern Asia and northern Australia	Size: 18–25 cm (7–10 in) long, plus 2–5 cm (1–2 in) tail 12–17 cm (5–7 in) forearm length Habitat: Forest, rocky areas, and caves	LC Unknown
Panniet naked-backed fruit bat	D. pannietensis Vis, 1905 Two subspecies: D. p. pannietensis; D. p. remota	Papua New Guinea	Size: 15–20 cm (6–8 in) long, plus 2–4 cm (1–2 in); 10–13 cm (4–5 in) forearm length Habitat: Forest and caves	NT Unknown
Philippine naked-backed fruit bat	D. chapmani Rabor, 1952	Philippines	Size: Unknown length, plus 2–4 cm (1–2 in); 12–14 cm (5–6 in) forearm length Habitat: Forest and caves	CR 40–50
Solomon's naked-backed fruit bat	D. inermis K. Andersen, 1909 Two subspecies: D. i. inermis; D. i. minimus	Solomon Islands	Size: 11–19 cm (4–7 in) long, plus 1–4 cm (0.4–1.6 in); 9–12 cm (4–5 in) forearm length Habitat: Forest and caves	LC Unknown
Sulawesi naked-backed fruit bat	D. exoleta K. Andersen, 1909	Indonesia	Size: 15–19 cm (6–7 in) long, plus 2–4 cm (1–2 in) tail 10–13 cm (4–5 in) forearm length Habitat: Forest and caves	LC Unknown
Western naked-backed fruit bat	D. peronii (Geoffroy, 1810) Two subspecies: D. p. grandis; D. p. peronii	Indonesia	Size: 14–16 cm (6–6 in) long, plus 2–4 cm (1–2 in) tail 11–13 cm (4–5 in) forearm length Habitat: Forest and caves	LC Unknown

Genus Harpyionycteris – Thomas, 1896 – two species
Common name	Scientific name and subspecies	Range	Size and ecology	IUCN status and estimated population
Harpy fruit bat	H. whiteheadi Thomas, 1896 Two subspecies: H. w. negrosensis; H. w. whiteheadi	Philippines	Size: 13–16 cm (5–6 in) long, with no tail 8–10 cm (3–4 in) forearm length Habitat: Forest	LC Unknown
Sulawesi harpy fruit bat	H. celebensis Miller & Hollister, 1921	Indonesia	Size: 11–16 cm (4–6 in) long, with no tail 7–10 cm (3–4 in) forearm length Habitat: Forest	NT Unknown

=== Subfamily Macroglossusinae ===
Genus Macroglossus – F. Cuvier, 1824 – two species
Common name	Scientific name and subspecies	Range	Size and ecology	IUCN status and estimated population
Long-tongued fruit bat	M. sobrinus K. Andersen, 1911	Southeastern Asia	Size: 7–9 cm (3–4 in) long, plus 0–1 cm (0.0–0.4 in) tail 3–6 cm (1–2 in) forearm length Habitat: Forest	LC Unknown
Long-tongued nectar bat	M. minimus (Geoffroy, 1810)	Southeastern Asia and northern Australia	Size: 4–8 cm (2–3 in) long, plus 0–1 cm (0.0–0.4 in) tail 3–5 cm (1–2 in) forearm length Habitat: Forest	LC Unknown

Genus Melonycteris – Dobson, 1877 – one species
Common name	Scientific name and subspecies	Range	Size and ecology	IUCN status and estimated population
Black-bellied fruit bat	M. melanops Dobson, 1877	Papua New Guinea	Size: 7–11 cm (3–4 in) long, with no tail 5–7 cm (2–3 in) forearm length Habitat: Forest and caves	LC Unknown

Genus Nesonycteris – Thomas, 1887 – four species
Common name	Scientific name and subspecies	Range	Size and ecology	IUCN status and estimated population
Fardoulis's blossom bat	N. fardoulisi Flannery, 1993 Two subspecies: N. f. fardoulisi; N. f. schouteni	Solomon Islands	Size: 8–10 cm (3–4 in) long, with no tail 5–7 cm (2–3 in) forearm length Habitat: Forest	NT Unknown
McCoy's blossom bat	N. maccoyi Flannery, 1993	Solomon Islands	Size: 8–10 cm (3–4 in) long, with no tail 5–7 cm (2–3 in) forearm length Habitat: Forest	NE Unknown
New Georgia blossom bat	N. mengermani Flannery, 1993	Solomon Islands	Size: 8–10 cm (3–4 in) long, with no tail 5–7 cm (2–3 in) forearm length Habitat: Forest	NE Unknown
Woodford's fruit bat	N. woodfordi Thomas, 1887 Two subspecies: N. w. aurantius; N. w. woodfordi	Solomon Islands	Size: 8–11 cm (3–4 in) long, with no tail 4–6 cm (2 in) forearm length Habitat: Forest	LC Unknown

Genus Notopteris – Gray, 1859 – two species
Common name	Scientific name and subspecies	Range	Size and ecology	IUCN status and estimated population
Long-tailed fruit bat	N. macdonaldi Gray, 1859	Fiji and Vanuatu	Size: 9–11 cm (4 in) long, plus 5–7 cm (2–3 in) tail 6–7 cm (2–3 in) forearm length Habitat: Forest and caves	VU 8,000–10,000
New Caledonia blossom bat	N. neocaledonica Trouessart, 1908	New Caledonia	Size: 9–10 cm (4–4 in) long, plus 4–6 cm (2 in) tail 5–6 cm (2 in) forearm length Habitat: Caves and forest	EN 1,500–2,500

Genus Syconycteris – Matschie, 1899 – three species
Common name	Scientific name and subspecies	Range	Size and ecology	IUCN status and estimated population
Common blossom bat	S. australis (Peters, 1867) Seven subspecies: S. a. australis; S. a. crassa; S. a. finschi; S. a. keyensis; S. a. major; S. a. naias; S. a. papuana	Southeastern Asia and northern Australia	Size: 5–8 cm (2–3 in) long, with no tail 3–5 cm (1–2 in) forearm length Habitat: Forest, savanna, and shrubland	LC Unknown
Halmahera blossom bat	S. carolinae Rozendaal, 1984	Indonesia	Size: 8–10 cm (3–4 in) long, with no tail 5–7 cm (2–3 in) forearm length Habitat: Forest	NT 10,000–11,000
Moss-forest blossom bat	S. hobbit Ziegler, 1982	New Guinea	Size: 5–8 cm (2–3 in) long, with no tail 4–6 cm (2 in) forearm length Habitat: Forest	LC Unknown

=== Subfamily Nyctimeninae ===
Genus Nyctimene – Borkhausen, 1797 – sixteen species
Common name	Scientific name and subspecies	Range	Size and ecology	IUCN status and estimated population
Broad-striped tube-nosed fruit bat	N. aello (Thomas, 1900)	Southeastern Asia	Size: 10–15 cm (4–6 in) long, plus 1–4 cm (0.4–1.6 in); 7–9 cm (3–4 in) forearm length Habitat: Forest	LC Unknown
Common tube-nosed fruit bat	N. albiventer (Gray, 1863) Two subspecies: N. a. albiventer; N. a. papuanus	Southeastern Asia	Size: 7–12 cm (3–5 in) long, plus 1–3 cm (0.4–1.2 in); 5–7 cm (2–3 in) forearm length Habitat: Forest and savanna	LC Unknown
Demonic tube-nosed fruit bat	N. masalai Smith & Hood, 1983	Papua New Guinea	Size: 9–11 cm (4 in) long, plus 2–3 cm (1 in); 6–7 cm (2–3 in) forearm length Habitat: Unknown	DD Unknown
Dragon tube-nosed fruit bat	N. draconilla Thomas, 1922	New Guinea	Size: 7–9 cm (3–4 in) long, plus 1–3 cm (0.4–1.2 in); 4–6 cm (2 in) forearm length Habitat: Forest	DD Unknown
Eastern tube-nosed bat	N. robinsoni Thomas, 1904	Eastern Australia	Size: 8–10 cm (3–4 in) long, plus 2–3 cm (1 in); 6–7 cm (2–3 in) forearm length Habitat: Forest	LC Unknown
Island tube-nosed fruit bat	N. major (Dobson, 1877) Four subspecies: N. m. geminus; N. m. lullulae; N. m. major; N. m. scitulus	Papua New Guinea and Solomon Islands	Size: 9–14 cm (4–6 in) long, plus 1–4 cm (0.4–1.6 in); 6–9 cm (2–4 in) forearm length Habitat: Forest	LC Unknown
Keast's tube-nosed fruit bat	N. keasti Kitchener, 1993 Three subspecies: N. k. babari; N. k. keasti; N. k. tozeri	Indonesia	Size: 6–9 cm (2–4 in) long, plus 1–3 cm (0.4–1.2 in); 4–5 cm (2 in) forearm length Habitat: Forest	NT Unknown
Lesser tube-nosed bat	N. varius K. Andersen, 1910	Indonesia	Size: Unknown length About 6 cm (2 in) forearm length Habitat: Forest	VU Unknown
Malaita tube-nosed fruit bat	N. malaitensis Phillips, 1968	Solomon Islands	Size: About 12 cm (5 in) long, plus about 2 cm (1 in) about 7 cm (3 in) forearm length Habitat: Forest	LC Unknown
Mountain tube-nosed fruit bat	N. certans K. Andersen, 1912	New Guinea and New Britain	Size: 8–12 cm (3–5 in) long, plus 1–3 cm (0.4–1.2 in); 5–7 cm (2–3 in) forearm length Habitat: Forest	LC Unknown
Nendo tube-nosed fruit bat	N. sanctacrucis (Troughton, 1931)	Solomon Islands	Size: 9–14 cm (4–6 in) long, plus 1–4 cm (0.4–1.6 in); 6–9 cm (2–4 in) forearm length Habitat: Unknown	DD Unknown
New Guinea tube-nosed bat	N. wrightae Irwin, 2017	New Guinea	Size: 8–9 cm (3–4 in) long, plus 1–3 cm (0.4–1.2 in); 5–7 cm (2–3 in) forearm length Habitat: Forest and inland wetlands	LC Unknown
Pallas's tube-nosed bat	N. cephalotes (Pallas, 1767) Two subspecies: N. c. aplini; N. c. cephalotes	Southeastern Asia	Size: 8–10 cm (3–4 in) long, plus 1–3 cm (0.4–1.2 in); 6–7 cm (2–3 in) forearm length Habitat: Forest	LC Unknown
Philippine tube-nosed fruit bat	N. rabori Heaney & Peterson, 1984	Philippines	Size: 11–13 cm (4–5 in) long, plus 1–3 cm (0.4–1.2 in); 7–9 cm (3–4 in) forearm length Habitat: Forest	EN 2,000–2,500
Round-eared tube-nosed fruit bat	N. cyclotis K. Andersen, 1910	Indonesia	Size: Unknown length 5–6 cm (2 in) forearm length Habitat: Forest	DD Unknown
Umboi tube-nosed fruit bat	N. vizcaccia Thomas, 1914 Two subspecies: N. v. bougainville; N. v. vizcaccia	Papua New Guinea and Solomon Islands	Size: 7–12 cm (3–5 in) long, plus 1–3 cm (0.4–1.2 in); 5–7 cm (2–3 in) forearm length Habitat: Forest	LC Unknown

Genus Paranyctimene – Tate, 1942 – two species
Common name	Scientific name and subspecies	Range	Size and ecology	IUCN status and estimated population
Lesser tube-nosed fruit bat	P. raptor Tate, 1942	New Guinea and Indonesia	Size: 6–10 cm (2–4 in) long, plus 1–3 cm (0.4–1.2 in); 4–6 cm (2 in) forearm length Habitat: Forest	LC Unknown
Steadfast tube-nosed fruit bat	P. tenax Bergmans, 2001 Two subspecies: P. t. marculus; P. t. tenax	New Guinea and Indonesia	Size: Unknown length, plus 1–3 cm (0.4–1.2 in); 5–6 cm (2 in) forearm length Habitat: Forest	LC Unknown

=== Subfamily Pteropodinae ===
Genus Acerodon – Jourdan, 1837 – five species
Common name	Scientific name and subspecies	Range	Size and ecology	IUCN status and estimated population
Giant golden-crowned flying fox	A. jubatus (Eschscholtz, 1831) Three subspecies: A. j. jubatus; A. j. lucifer; A. j. mindanensis	Philippines	Size: 26–30 cm (10–12 in) long, with no tail 18–20 cm (7–8 in) forearm length Habitat: Forest	EN Unknown
Palawan fruit bat	A. leucotis (Sanborn, 1950) Two subspecies: A. l. leucotis; A. l. obscurus	Philippines	Size: Unknown length, with no tail 13–17 cm (5–7 in) forearm length Habitat: Forest	VU Unknown
Sulawesi flying fox	A. celebensis (Peters, 1867)	Indonesia	Size: 19–20 cm (7–8 in) long, with no tail 13–15 cm (5–6 in) forearm length Habitat: Forest	VU Unknown
Sunda flying fox	A. mackloti (Temminck, 1837) Five subspecies: A. m. alorensis; A. m. floresii; A. m. gilvus; A. m. mackloti; A. m. prajae	Indonesia	Size: About 23 cm (9 in) long, with no tail 13–15 cm (5–6 in) forearm length Habitat: Forest	VU Unknown
Talaud flying fox	A. humilis K. Andersen, 1909	Philippines	Size: Unknown length, with no tail about 14 cm (6 in) forearm length Habitat: Forest	EN Unknown

Genus Desmalopex – Miller, 1907 – two species
Common name	Scientific name and subspecies	Range	Size and ecology	IUCN status and estimated population
Small white-winged flying fox	D. microleucoptera Esselstyn, Garcia, Saulog, & Heaney, 2008	Philippines	Size: 13–16 cm (5–6 in) long, with no tail 9–11 cm (4 in) forearm length Habitat: Forest	EN Unknown
White-winged flying fox	D. leucoptera Temminck, 1853	Philippines	Size: 18–24 cm (7–9 in) long, with no tail 13–15 cm (5–6 in) forearm length Habitat: Forest and grassland	VU Unknown

Genus Mirimiri – Helgen, 2005 – one species
Common name	Scientific name and subspecies	Range	Size and ecology	IUCN status and estimated population
Fijian monkey-faced bat	M. acrodonta (Hill & Beckon, 1978)	Fiji	Size: 17–20 cm (7–8 in) long, with no tail 11–13 cm (4–5 in) forearm length Habitat: Forest	CR 200–1,000

Genus Neopteryx – Hayman, 1946 – one species
Common name	Scientific name and subspecies	Range	Size and ecology	IUCN status and estimated population
Small-toothed fruit bat	N. frosti Hayman, 1946	Indonesia	Size: About 16 cm (6 in) long, with no tail 10–12 cm (4–5 in) forearm length Habitat: Forest	EN 2,000–2,500

Genus Pteralopex – Thomas, 1888 – five species
Common name	Scientific name and subspecies	Range	Size and ecology	IUCN status and estimated population
Bougainville monkey-faced bat	P. anceps K. Andersen, 1909	Solomon Islands	Size: 23–28 cm (9–11 in) long, with no tail 14–16 cm (6 in) forearm length Habitat: Forest	EN Unknown
Greater monkey-faced bat	P. flanneryi Helgen, 2005	Solomon Islands	Size: 25–28 cm (10–11 in) long, with no tail 15–19 cm (6–7 in) forearm length Habitat: Forest	CR Unknown
Guadalcanal monkey-faced bat	P. atrata (Thomas, 1888)	Solomon Islands	Size: 19–24 cm (7–9 in) long, with no tail 12–15 cm (5–6 in) forearm length Habitat: Forest	EN Unknown
Montane monkey-faced bat	P. pulchra Flannery, 1991	Solomon Islands	Size: About 16 cm (6 in) long, with no tail about 12 cm (5 in) forearm length Habitat: Forest	CR 0–50
New Georgian monkey-faced bat	P. taki Parnaby, 2002	Solomon Islands	Size: About 19 cm (7 in) long, with no tail 11–13 cm (4–5 in) forearm length Habitat: Forest	VU 100–3,000

Genus Pteropus – Brisson, 1762 – 66 species
Common name	Scientific name and subspecies	Range	Size and ecology	IUCN status and estimated population
Admiralty flying fox	P. admiralitatum Thomas, 1894 Four subspecies: P. a. admiralitatum; P. a. colonus; P. a. goweri; P. a. solomonis	Papua New Guinea and Solomon Islands	Size: 17–23 cm (7–9 in) long, with no tail 11–13 cm (4–5 in) forearm length Habitat: Forest	LC Unknown
Aldabra flying fox	P. aldabrensis True, 1893	Seychelles	Size: 18–19 cm (7 in) long, with no tail 12–15 cm (5–6 in) forearm length Habitat: Shrubland and forest	EN 200–250
Andersen's flying fox	P. intermedius K. Andersen, 1908	Burma and Thailand	Size: 22–25 cm (9–10 in) long, with no tail 16–18 cm (6–7 in) forearm length Habitat: Forest	DD Unknown
Aru flying fox	P. aruensis Peters, 1867	Indonesia	Size: About 29 cm (11 in) long, with no tail about 19 cm (7 in) forearm length Habitat: Unknown	CR 0–50
Ashy-headed flying fox	P. caniceps Gray, 1870 Two subspecies: P. c. caniceps; P. c. dobsoni	Indonesia	Size: About 21 cm (8 in) long, with no tail 18–20 cm (7–8 in) forearm length Habitat: Forest	VU Unknown
Banks flying fox	P. fundatus Felten & Kock, 1972	Vanuatu	Size: 13–16 cm (5–6 in) long, with no tail 9–11 cm (4 in) forearm length Habitat: Forest	EN Unknown
Big-eared flying fox	P. macrotis Peters, 1867 Two subspecies: P. m. epularius; P. m. macrotis	New Guinea	Size: 17–24 cm (7–9 in) long, with no tail 11–16 cm (4–6 in) forearm length Habitat: Forest and shrubland	LC Unknown
Bismarck masked flying fox	P. capistratus Peters, 1867 Two subspecies: P. c. capistratus; P. c. ennisae	Papua New Guinea	Size: 14–20 cm (6–8 in) long, with no tail 10–13 cm (4–5 in) forearm length Habitat: Forest	VU 9,000–10,000
Black flying fox	P. alecto Temminck, 1837 Four subspecies: P. a. alecto; P. a. aterrimus; P. a. gouldi; P. a. morio	Southeastern Asia and northern Australia	Size: 18–28 cm (7–11 in) long, with no tail 15–20 cm (6–8 in) forearm length Habitat: Forest	LC Unknown
Black-bearded flying fox	P. melanopogon Peters, 1867	Southeastern Asia	Size: About 29 cm (11 in) long, with no tail 18–20 cm (7–8 in) forearm length Habitat: Forest	EN Unknown
Black-eared flying fox	P. melanotus Blyth, 1863 Five subspecies: P. m. melanotus; P. m. modiglianii; P. m. natalis; P. m. niadicus; P. m. tytleri	Southeastern Asia	Size: Unknown length, with no tail 11–17 cm (4–7 in) forearm length Habitat: Forest and inland wetlands	VU 5,000–7,000
Bonin flying fox	P. pselaphon Lay, 1829	Bonin Islands in Japan	Size: Unknown length, with no tail 13–15 cm (5–6 in) forearm length Habitat: Forest	EN 200–250
Caroline flying fox	P. molossinus Temminck, 1853	Micronesia	Size: 14–15 cm (6 in) long, with no tail 9–10 cm (4 in) forearm length Habitat: Forest	EN Unknown
Ceram fruit bat	P. ocularis Peters, 1867	Indonesia	Size: About 20 cm (8 in) long, with no tail 13–15 cm (5–6 in) forearm length Habitat: Forest	VU Unknown
Chuuk flying fox	P. pelagicus Kittlitz, 1836	Micronesia	Size: 15–19 cm (6–7 in) long, with no tail 10–11 cm (4 in) forearm length Habitat: Forest	EN 1,000–2,500
Dwarf flying fox	P. woodfordi Thomas, 1888	Solomon Islands	Size: 9–15 cm (4–6 in) long, with no tail 8–10 cm (3–4 in) forearm length Habitat: Forest	LC Unknown
Geelvink Bay flying fox	P. pohlei Stein, 1933	Indonesia	Size: 17–21 cm (7–8 in) long, with no tail 12–14 cm (5–6 in) forearm length Habitat: Forest	VU Unknown
Gilliard's flying fox	P. gilliardorum Van Deusen, 1969	Papua New Guinea	Size: 15–18 cm (6–7 in) long, with no tail 11–12 cm (4–5 in) forearm length Habitat: Forest	VU Unknown
Gray flying fox	P. griseus Geoffroy, 1810 Three subspecies: P. g. griseus; P. g. mimus; P. g. pallidus	Indonesia	Size: 17–22 cm (7–9 in) long, with no tail 11–13 cm (4–5 in) forearm length Habitat: Forest	VU 8,000–9,000
Great flying fox	P. neohibernicus Peters, 1876 Two subspecies: P. n. hilli; P. n. neohibernicus	New Guinea and Bismarck Archipelago	Size: 23–37 cm (9–15 in) long, with no tail 16–22 cm (6–9 in) forearm length Habitat: Forest and savanna	LC Unknown
Grey-headed flying fox	P. poliocephalus Temminck, 1825	Southeastern Australia	Size: 22–28 cm (9–11 in) long, with no tail 15–18 cm (6–7 in) forearm length Habitat: Caves and forest	VU 467,000
Guam flying fox†	P. tokudae Tate, 1934	Guam	Size: Unknown Habitat: Forest	EX Unknown
Indian flying fox	P. medius Temminck, 1825	Southern Asia	Size: 22–25 cm (9–10 in) long, with no tail 16–18 cm (6–7 in) forearm length Habitat: Forest	NT Unknown
Insular flying fox	P. tonganus Quoy & Gaimard, 1830 Three subspecies: P. t. basiliscus; P. t. geddiei; P. t. tonganus	Eastern Oceania	Size: 14–27 cm (6–11 in) long, with no tail 11–18 cm (4–7 in) forearm length Habitat: Forest	LC Unknown
Kei flying fox	P. keyensis Peters, 1867	Indonesia	Size: About 29 cm (11 in) long, with no tail 17–19 cm (7–7 in) forearm length Habitat: Unknown	DD Unknown
Kosrae flying fox	P. ualanus Peters, 1883	Island of Kosrae in Micronesia	Size: 18–23 cm (7–9 in) long, with no tail 12–14 cm (5–6 in) forearm length Habitat: Forest	EN 1,500–2,250
Large Palau flying fox†	P. pilosus K. Andersen, 1908	Micronesia	Size: Unknown Habitat: Unknown	EX Unknown
Large Samoan flying fox†	P. coxi Helgen, Helgen, & Wilson, 2009	Samoa	Size: Unknown Habitat: Unknown	EX Unknown
Large flying fox	P. vampyrus (Linnaeus, 1758) Six subspecies: P. v. edulis; P. v. lanensis; P. v. natunae; P. v. pluton; P. v. sumatrensis; P. v. vampyrus	Southeastern Asia	Size: 22–29 cm (9–11 in) long, with no tail 17–23 cm (7–9 in) forearm length Habitat: Forest and inland wetlands	EN Unknown
Lesser flying fox	P. mahaganus Sanborn, 1931	Papua New Guinea and Solomon Islands	Size: 19–23 cm (7–9 in) long, with no tail 12–16 cm (5–6 in) forearm length Habitat: Forest	LC Unknown
Little golden-mantled flying fox	P. pumilus Miller, 1911	Philippines	Size: 15–18 cm (6–7 in) long, with no tail 9–12 cm (4–5 in) forearm length Habitat: Shrubland and forest	NT Unknown
Little red flying fox	P. scapulatus Peters, 1862	Northern and eastern Australia	Size: 12–20 cm (5–8 in) long, with no tail 11–15 cm (4–6 in) forearm length Habitat: Forest and shrubland	LC Unknown
Livingstone's fruit bat	P. livingstonii Gray, 1866	Comoros	Size: About 34 cm (13 in) long, with no tail 16–18 cm (6–7 in) forearm length Habitat: Forest	EN 1,200–1,500
Lombok flying fox	P. lombocensis Dobson, 1878 Three subspecies: P. l. heudei; P. l. lombocensis; P. l. salottii	Indonesia	Size: 15–18 cm (6–7 in) long, with no tail 11–13 cm (4–5 in) forearm length Habitat: Forest	DD Unknown
Lyle's flying fox	P. lylei K. Andersen, 1908	Southeastern Asia	Size: About 20 cm (8 in) long, with no tail 14–16 cm (6 in) forearm length Habitat: Forest	VU Unknown
Madagascan flying fox	P. rufus Geoffroy, 1803	Madagascar	Size: 23–27 cm (9–11 in) long, with no tail 15–18 cm (6–7 in) forearm length Habitat: Forest	VU 300,000
Makira flying fox	P. cognatus K. Andersen, 1908	Solomon Islands	Size: 16–18 cm (6–7 in) long, with no tail 12–13 cm (5 in) forearm length Habitat: Forest	VU Unknown
Mariana fruit bat	P. mariannus Desmarest, 1822 Three subspecies: P. m. mariannus; P. m. paganensis; P. m. ulthiensis	Mariana Islands and Caroline Islands	Size: 19–25 cm (7–10 in) long, with no tail 13–16 cm (5–6 in) forearm length Habitat: Forest	EN Unknown
Masked flying fox	P. personatus Temminck, 1825	Indonesia	Size: 12–15 cm (5–6 in) long, with no tail 8–10 cm (3–4 in) forearm length Habitat: Forest	LC Unknown
Mauritian flying fox	P. niger (Kerr, 1792)	Mauritius and La Réunion	Size: About 23 cm (9 in) long, with no tail 14–18 cm (6–7 in) forearm length Habitat: Forest	EN 38,000
Moluccan flying fox	P. chrysoproctus Temminck, 1837	Indonesia	Size: 19–26 cm (7–10 in) long, with no tail 16–18 cm (6–7 in) forearm length Habitat: Forest	VU Unknown
New Caledonia flying fox	P. vetulus Jouan, 1863	New Caledonia	Size: 12–15 cm (5–6 in) long, with no tail 9–12 cm (4–5 in) forearm length Habitat: Forest	NT Unknown
New Ireland masked flying fox	P. ennisae Flannery & White, 1991	Papua New Guinea	Size: 15–19 cm (6–7 in) long, with no tail 10–12 cm (4–5 in) forearm length Habitat: Forest	VU 9,000–10,000
Nicobar flying fox	P. faunulus Miller, 1902	Nicobar Islands in India	Size: About 17 cm (7 in) long, with no tail 11–13 cm (4–5 in) forearm length Habitat: Forest	EN Unknown
Okinawa flying fox	P. loochoensis Gray, 1870	Japan	Size: 19–25 cm (7–10 in) long, with no tail 13–16 cm (5–6 in) forearm length Habitat: Unknown	DD Unknown
Ontong Java flying fox	P. howensis Troughton, 1931	Solomon Islands	Size: 17–20 cm (7–8 in) long, with no tail 11–13 cm (4–5 in) forearm length Habitat: Forest	CR 100–300
Ornate flying fox	P. ornatus Gray, 1870 Two subspecies: P. o. auratus; P. o. ornatus	New Caledonia	Size: 18–19 cm (7–7 in) long, with no tail 14–17 cm (6–7 in) forearm length Habitat: Forest	VU Unknown
Pelew flying fox	P. pelewensis K. Andersen, 1908	Palau	Size: 14–32 cm (6–13 in) long, with no tail 10–14 cm (4–6 in) forearm length Habitat: Forest and savanna	VU Unknown
Pemba flying fox	P. voeltzkowi Matschie, 1909	Island of Pemba in Tanzania	Size: 22–26 cm (9–10 in) long, with no tail 14–17 cm (6–7 in) forearm length Habitat: Forest	VU Unknown
Percy Island flying fox†	P. brunneus Dobson, 1878.	Percy Island in Australia	Size: Unknown Habitat: Unknown	EX Unknown
Philippine gray flying fox	P. speciosus K. Andersen, 1908	Indonesia and Philippines	Size: Unknown length, with no tail 12–13 cm (5 in) forearm length Habitat: Forest	DD Unknown
Rennell flying fox	P. rennelli Troughton, 1929.	Solomon Islands	Size: 14–19 cm (6–7 in) long, with no tail 9–13 cm (4–5 in) forearm length Habitat: Forest	EN Unknown
Rodrigues flying fox	P. rodricensis Dobson, 1878	Island of Rodrigues	Size: 15–20 cm (6–8 in) long, with no tail 12–13 cm (5 in) forearm length Habitat: Forest	EN 20,000
Ryukyu flying fox	P. dasymallus Temminck, 1825 Five subspecies: P. d. daitonensis; P. d. dasymallus; P. d. formosus; P. d. inopinatus; P. d. yayeyamae	Eastern Asia	Size: 18–23 cm (7–9 in) long, with no tail 12–15 cm (5–6 in) forearm length Habitat: Forest	VU 3,000–6,000
Samoa flying fox	P. samoensis Peale, 1848 Two subspecies: P. s. nawaiensis; P. s. samoensis	Samoa and Fiji	Size: 17–22 cm (7–9 in) long, with no tail 12–16 cm (5–6 in) forearm length Habitat: Forest	NT Unknown
Seychelles fruit bat	P. seychellensis Kerr, 1792	Seychelles, Comoros, and Mafia Island	Size: About 23 cm (9 in) long, with no tail 14–16 cm (6 in) forearm length Habitat: Forest	LC Unknown
Small Comoro flying fox	P. comorensis Nicoll, 1908	Comoro Islands	Size: About 23 cm (9 in) long, with no tail 14–16 cm (6 in) forearm length Habitat: Forest	NE Unknown
Small Mauritian flying fox†	P. subniger Kerr, 1792	Mascarene Islands	Size: Unknown Habitat: Unknown and forest	EX Unknown
Small Samoan flying fox†	P. allenorum Helgen, Helgen, & Wilson, 2009	Samoa	Size: Unknown Habitat: Unknown	EX Unknown
Small flying fox	P. hypomelanus Temminck, 1853 Sixteen subspecies: P. h. annectens; P. h. cagayanus; P. h. canus; P. h. condorensis; P. h. enganus; P. h. fretensis; P. h. geminorum; P. h. hypomelanus; P. h. lepidus; P. h. luteus; P. h. macassaricus; P. h. maris; P. h. robinsoni; P. h. satyrus; P. h. simalurus; P. h. tomesi	Southeastern Asia	Size: Unknown length, with no tail 11–17 cm (4–7 in) forearm length Habitat: Forest	NT Unknown
Solomons flying fox	P. rayneri Gray, 1870 Five subspecies: P. r. grandis; P. r. lavellanus; P. r. monoensis; P. r. rayneri; P. r. rubianus	Solomon Islands	Size: 23–27 cm (9–11 in) long, with no tail 13–19 cm (5–7 in) forearm length Habitat: Forest	NT Unknown
Spectacled flying fox	P. conspicillatus Gould, 1850 Two subspecies: P. c. chrysauchen; P. c. conspicillatus	Southeastern Asia and northern Australia	Size: 23–29 cm (9–11 in) long, with no tail 15–19 cm (6–7 in) forearm length Habitat: Forest	EN Unknown
Temminck's flying fox	P. temminckii Peters, 1867 Two subspecies: P. t. liops; P. t. temminckii	Indonesia	Size: 15–17 cm (6–7 in) long, with no tail 9–11 cm (4 in) forearm length Habitat: Forest	VU Unknown
Temotu flying fox	P. nitendiensis Sanborn, 1930	Solomon Islands	Size: 17–18 cm (7 in) long, with no tail 11–13 cm (4–5 in) forearm length Habitat: Forest	EN Unknown
Vanikoro flying fox	P. tuberculatus Peters, 1869	Solomon Islands	Size: 13–17 cm (5–7 in) long, with no tail 11–13 cm (4–5 in) forearm length Habitat: Forest	EN Unknown
Vanuatu flying fox	P. anetianus Gray, 1870 Seven subspecies: P. a. anetianus; P. a. aorensis; P. a. bakeri; P. a. banksiana; P. a. eotinus; P. a. motalavae; P. a. pastoris	Vanuatu	Size: 15–20 cm (6–8 in) long, with no tail 11–14 cm (4–6 in) forearm length Habitat: Forest	VU Unknown

Genus Styloctenium – Matschie, 1899 – two species
Common name	Scientific name and subspecies	Range	Size and ecology	IUCN status and estimated population
Mindoro stripe-faced fruit bat	S. mindorense Esselstyn, 2007	Philippines (in red)	Size: 14–18 cm (6–7 in) long, with no tail 10–12 cm (4–5 in) forearm length Habitat: Forest	EN Unknown
Sulawesi stripe-faced fruit bat	S. wallacei (Gray, 1866)	Indonesia	Size: 14–20 cm (6–8 in) long, with no tail 9–11 cm (4 in) forearm length Habitat: Forest	NT Unknown

=== Subfamily Rousettinae ===
Genus Casinycteris – Thomas, 1910 – three species
Common name	Scientific name and subspecies	Range	Size and ecology	IUCN status and estimated population
Campo-Ma'an fruit bat	C. campomaanensis Hassanin, 2014	Cameroon	Size: Unknown, with no tail about 7 cm (3 in) forearm length Habitat: Forest	DD Unknown
Pohle's fruit bat	C. ophiodon Pohle, 1943	Western Africa	Size: 11–13 cm (4–5 in) long, with no tail 7–9 cm (3–4 in) forearm length Habitat: Forest	NE Unknown
Short-palated fruit bat	C. argynnis Thomas, 1910	Central Africa	Size: 7–10 cm (3–4 in) long, with no tail 5–7 cm (2–3 in) forearm length Habitat: Forest	LC Unknown

Genus Eonycteris – Dobson, 1873 – three species
Common name	Scientific name and subspecies	Range	Size and ecology	IUCN status and estimated population
Cave nectar bat	E. spelaea (Dobson, 1871) Four subspecies: E. s. glandifera; E. s. rosenbergii; E. s. spelaea; E. s. winnyae	Southern and southeastern Asia	Size: 7–13 cm (3–5 in) long, plus 1–3 cm (0.4–1.2 in) tail 6–8 cm (2–3 in) forearm length Habitat: Forest and caves	LC Unknown
Greater nectar bat	E. major K. Andersen, 1910	Island of Borneo	Size: 12–13 cm (5 in) long, plus 1–3 cm (0.4–1.2 in) tail 6–9 cm (2–4 in) forearm length Habitat: Forest and caves	NT Unknown
Philippine dawn bat	E. robusta Miller, 1913	Philippines	Size: 10–13 cm (4–5 in) long, plus 2–3 cm (1 in) tail 6–9 cm (2–4 in) forearm length Habitat: Forest and caves	VU Unknown

Genus Epomophorus – Bennett, 1836 – eleven species
Common name	Scientific name and subspecies	Range	Size and ecology	IUCN status and estimated population
Angolan epauletted fruit bat	E. angolensis Gray, 1870	Angola and Namibia	Size: 13–16 cm (5–6 in) long, with no tail 8–10 cm (3–4 in) forearm length Habitat: Savanna	NT Unknown
Ansell's epauletted fruit bat	E. anselli Bergmans & van Strien, 2004	Malawi	Size: 10–15 cm (4–6 in) long, plus 0.2–0.5 cm (0.1–0.2 in) tail 6–8 cm (2–3 in) forearm length Habitat: Savanna	DD Unknown
Dobson's epauletted fruit bat	E. dobsonii Bocage, 1899	Southern Africa	Size: 13–19 cm (5–7 in) long, plus 0–0.1 cm (0.00–0.04 in) tail 8–10 cm (3–4 in) forearm length Habitat: Savanna	LC Unknown
Ethiopian epauletted fruit bat	E. labiatus Temminck, 1837	Central and eastern Africa	Size: 9–12 cm (4–5 in) long, plus 0–0.5 cm (0.0–0.2 in) tail 5–8 cm (2–3 in) forearm length Habitat: Forest, savanna, shrubland, and grassland	LC Unknown
Gambian epauletted fruit bat	E. gambianus (Ogilby, 1835) Two subspecies: E. g. gambianus; E. g. pousarguesi	Equatorial Africa	Size: 10–17 cm (4–7 in) long, plus 0–1 cm (0.0–0.4 in) tail 7–10 cm (3–4 in) forearm length Habitat: Forest and savanna	LC Unknown
Hayman's dwarf epauletted fruit bat	E. intermedius Hayman, 1963	Angola and Democratic Republic of the Congo	Size: Unknown length, plus 0.3–0.5 cm (0.1–0.2 in) tail 5–7 cm (2–3 in) forearm length Habitat: Forest and savanna	DD Unknown
Lesser Angolan epauletted fruit bat	E. grandis (Sanborn, 1950)	Angola and Democratic Republic of the Congo	Size: About 10 cm (4 in) long, plus 0.4–1 cm (0.2–0.4 in) tail 6–7 cm (2–3 in) forearm length Habitat: Forest and savanna	DD Unknown
Minor epauletted fruit bat	E. minor Dobson, 1879	Central and eastern Africa and western Arabian Peninsula	Size: 9–12 cm (4–5 in) long, with no tail 5–7 cm (2–3 in) forearm length Habitat: Forest, savanna, shrubland, and grassland	LC Unknown
Peters's dwarf epauletted fruit bat	E. pusillus (Peters, 1867)	Sub-Saharan Africa	Size: 6–11 cm (2–4 in) long, plus 0–0.5 cm (0.0–0.2 in) tail 4–6 cm (2 in) forearm length Habitat: Forest, savanna, and shrubland	LC Unknown
Peters's epauletted fruit bat	E. crypturus Peters, 1852	Southeastern Africa	Size: 11–17 cm (4–7 in) long, plus 0–0.5 cm (0.0–0.2 in) tail 7–9 cm (3–4 in) forearm length Habitat: Savanna	LC Unknown
Wahlberg's epauletted fruit bat	E. wahlbergi (Sundevall, 1846)	Southern Africa	Size: 10–19 cm (4–7 in) long, plus 0–1 cm (0.0–0.4 in) tail 6–10 cm (2–4 in) forearm length Habitat: Forest, savanna, and shrubland	LC Unknown

Genus Epomops – Gray, 1870 – two species
Common name	Scientific name and subspecies	Range	Size and ecology	IUCN status and estimated population
Buettikofer's epauletted fruit bat	E. buettikoferi (Matschie, 1899)	Western Africa	Size: 10–20 cm (4–8 in) long, with no tail 8–11 cm (3–4 in) forearm length Habitat: Forest, savanna, and shrubland	LC Unknown
Franquet's epauletted fruit bat	E. franqueti (Tomes, 1860)	Central Africa	Size: 11–18 cm (4–7 in) long, plus 0–0.1 cm (0.00–0.04 in) tail 7–11 cm (3–4 in) forearm length Habitat: Forest and savanna	LC Unknown

Genus Hypsignathus – H. Allen, 1861 – one species
Common name	Scientific name and subspecies	Range	Size and ecology	IUCN status and estimated population
Hammer-headed bat	H. monstrosus H. Allen, 1861	Western and central Africa	Size: 16–30 cm (6–12 in) long, with no tail 11–14 cm (4–6 in) forearm length Habitat: Forest and savanna	LC Unknown

Genus Megaloglossus – Pagenstecher, 1885 – two species
Common name	Scientific name and subspecies	Range	Size and ecology	IUCN status and estimated population
Azagnyi fruit bat	M. azagnyi Nesi, Kadjo, & Hassanin, 2012	Western Africa	Size: 6–9 cm (2–4 in) long, with no tail 3–5 cm (1–2 in) forearm length Habitat: Forest	LC Unknown
Woermann's bat	M. woermanni Pagenstecher, 1885	Western and central Africa	Size: 6–8 cm (2–3 in) long, with no tail 3–5 cm (1–2 in) forearm length Habitat: Forest	LC Unknown

Genus Myonycteris – Matschie, 1899 – five species
Common name	Scientific name and subspecies	Range	Size and ecology	IUCN status and estimated population
Angolan rousette	M. angolensis (Bocage, 1898)	Sub-Saharan Africa	Size: 9–14 cm (4–6 in) long, plus 0.5–3 cm (0.2–1.2 in) tail 6–9 cm (2–4 in) forearm length Habitat: Forest, savanna, shrubland, grassland, rocky areas, and caves	LC Unknown
East African little collared fruit bat	M. relicta Bergmans, 1980	Eastern Africa	Size: 9–12 cm (4–5 in) long, plus 0.5–2 cm (0.2–0.8 in) tail 6–8 cm (2–3 in) forearm length Habitat: Savanna and forest	LC Unknown
Little collared fruit bat	M. torquata Dobson, 1878	Western and central Africa	Size: 8–13 cm (3–5 in) long, plus 0–2 cm (0–1 in) tail 5–7 cm (2–3 in) forearm length Habitat: Forest	LC Unknown
Sierra Leone collared fruit bat	M. leptodon K. Andersen, 1908	Western Africa	Size: 8–12 cm (3–5 in) long, plus 0–2 cm (0–1 in) tail 5–7 cm (2–3 in) forearm length Habitat: Forest	LC Unknown
São Tomé collared fruit bat	M. brachycephala (Bocage, 1889)	São Tomé and Príncipe	Size: 9–11 cm (4 in) long, plus about 0.1 cm (0.04 in) tail 6–7 cm (2–3 in) forearm length Habitat: Forest	EN Unknown

Genus Nanonycteris – Matschie, 1899 – one species
Common name	Scientific name and subspecies	Range	Size and ecology	IUCN status and estimated population
Veldkamp's dwarf epauletted fruit bat	N. veldkampii (Jentink, 1888)	Western Africa	Size: 6–9 cm (2–4 in) long, plus 0.1–0.5 cm (0.0–0.2 in) tail 4–6 cm (2 in) forearm length Habitat: Forest and savanna	LC Unknown

Genus Pilonycteris – Nesi, Tsang, Simmons, McGowen, & Rossiter, 2021 – one species
Common name	Scientific name and subspecies	Range	Size and ecology	IUCN status and estimated population
Sulawesi rousette	P. celebensis (K. Andersen, 1907)	Indonesia	Size: 8–11 cm (3–4 in) long, plus 2–3 cm (1 in) tail 7–8 cm (3 in) forearm length Habitat: Forest and caves	LC Unknown

Genus Plerotes – K. Andersen, 1910 – one species
Common name	Scientific name and subspecies	Range	Size and ecology	IUCN status and estimated population
D'Anchieta's fruit bat	P. anchietae (Seabra, 1900)	Southern Africa	Size: 7–10 cm (3–4 in) long, with no tail 4–6 cm (2 in) forearm length Habitat: Forest and savanna	LC Unknown

Genus Rousettus – Gray, 1821 – seven species
Common name	Scientific name and subspecies	Range	Size and ecology	IUCN status and estimated population
Bare-backed rousette	R. spinalatus Bergmans & Hill, 1980	Southeastern Asia	Size: About 11 cm (4 in) long, plus 0.5–2 cm (0.2–0.8 in) tail 8–9 cm (3–4 in) forearm length Habitat: Forest and caves	VU Unknown
Comoro rousette	R. obliviosus Kock, 1978	Comoros Islands	Size: 12–15 cm (5–6 in) long, plus 1–3 cm (0.4–1.2 in) tail 7–8 cm (3 in) forearm length Habitat: Forest and caves	VU Unknown
Egyptian fruit bat	R. aegyptiacus (Geoffroy, 1810) Six subspecies: R. a. aegyptiacus; R. a. arabicus; R. a. leachii; R. a. princes; R. a. tomensis; R. a. unicolor	Africa and western Asia	Size: 13–20 cm (5–8 in) long, plus 0.5–3 cm (0.2–1.2 in) tail 8–11 cm (3–4 in) forearm length Habitat: Forest, savanna, shrubland, grassland, caves, and desert	LC Unknown
Geoffroy's rousette	R. amplexicaudatus Geoffroy, 1810 Five subspecies: R. a. amplexicaudatus; R. a. brachyotis; R. a. hedigeri; R. a. infumatus; R. a. minor	Southeastern Asia	Size: 12–16 cm (5–6 in) long, plus 1–3 cm (0.4–1.2 in) tail 7–10 cm (3–4 in) forearm length Habitat: Forest, rocky areas, and caves	LC Unknown
Leschenault's rousette	R. leschenaultii Desmarest, 1820 Three subspecies: R. l. leschenaultii; R. l. seminudus; R. l. shortridgei	Southern and southeastern Asia	Size: 8–13 cm (3–5 in) long, plus 1–2 cm (0.4–0.8 in) tail 7–10 cm (3–4 in) forearm length Habitat: Forest and caves	NT Unknown
Linduan rousette	R. linduensis Maryanto & Yani, 2003	Indonesia	Size: 10–12 cm (4–5 in) long, plus 2–4 cm (1–2 in) tail 7–8 cm (3 in) forearm length Habitat: Forest	DD Unknown
Madagascan rousette	R. madagascariensis Grandidier, 1928	Madagascar	Size: 11–15 cm (4–6 in) long, plus 0.5–2 cm (0–1 in) tail 6–8 cm (2–3 in) forearm length Habitat: Forest and caves	VU Unknown

Genus Scotonycteris – Matschie, 1894 – three species
Common name	Scientific name and subspecies	Range	Size and ecology	IUCN status and estimated population
Bergmans's fruit bat	S. bergmansi Hassanin, Khouider, Gembu, Goodman, Kadjo, Nesi, Pourrut, Nakouné, & Bonillo, 2014	Western and central Africa	Size: 6–9 cm (2–4 in) long, with no tail 4–6 cm (2 in) forearm length Habitat: Forest	LC Unknown
Hayman's fruit bat	S. occidentalis Hayman, 1947	Western Africa	Size: 6–9 cm (2–4 in) long, with no tail 4–6 cm (2 in) forearm length Habitat: Forest	LC Unknown
Zenker's fruit bat	S. zenkeri Matschie, 1894 Two subspecies: S. z. bedfordi; S. z. zenkeri	Western and central Africa	Size: 6–9 cm (2–4 in) long, with no tail 4–6 cm (2 in) forearm length Habitat: Forest	NT Unknown

Genus Stenonycteris – Thomas, 1906 – one species
Common name	Scientific name and subspecies	Range	Size and ecology	IUCN status and estimated population
Long-haired fruit bat	S. lanosus (Thomas, 1906)	Eastern Africa	Size: 11–18 cm (4–7 in) long, plus 0.5–3 cm (0.2–1.2 in) tail 8–10 cm (3–4 in) forearm length Habitat: Forest, savanna, and shrubland	LC Unknown

== Sources ==
- Chernasky, Amy; Motis, Anna; Burgin, Connor, eds. (2023). All the Mammals of the World. Lynx Nature Books. ISBN 978-84-16728-66-4.
- Simmons, Nancy B. (2005). Wilson, Don E.; Reeder, DeeAnn M. (eds.). Mammal Species of the World. Vol. 1 (3rd ed.). Johns Hopkins University Press. ISBN 978-0-8018-8221-0.
- Nowak, Ronald M. (1994). Walker's Bats of the World. Johns Hopkins University Press. ISBN 978-0-8018-4986-2.
