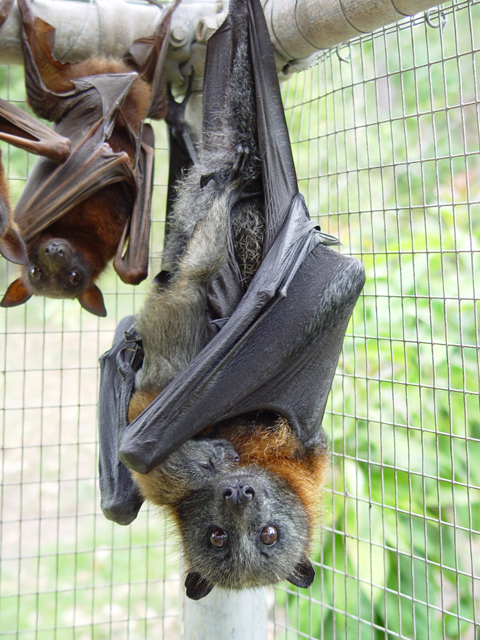
- Pteropus poliocephalus with baby

Scientific classification
- Kingdom: Animalia
- Phylum: Chordata
- Class: Mammalia
- Order: Chiroptera
- Family: Pteropodidae
- Subfamily: Pteropodinae (Gray, 1821)

Genera
- Acerodon; Desmalopex; Eidolon; Mirimiri; Neopteryx; Pteralopex; Pteropus; Styloctenium

= Pteropodinae =

Subfamily of bats

The Pteropodinae are a subfamily of megabats.

== Taxonomy ==
- Genus Acerodon
  - Sulawesi flying fox, A. celebensis
  - Talaud flying fox, A. humilis
  - Giant golden-crowned flying fox, A. jubatus
  - Palawan fruit bat, A. leucotis
  - Sunda flying fox, A. mackloti
- Genus Desmalopex
  - White-winged flying fox, D. leucopterus
  - Small white-winged flying fox, D. microleucopterus
- Genus Eidolon — straw-coloured fruit bats
  - Madagascan fruit bat, E. dupreanum
  - Straw-coloured fruit bat, E. helvum
- Genus Mirimiri
  - Fijian monkey-faced bat, M. acrodonta
- Genus Neopteryx
  - Small-toothed fruit bat, N. frosti
- Genus Pteralopex - flying monkeys
  - Bougainville monkey-faced bat, P. anceps
  - Guadalcanal monkey-faced bat, P. atrata
  - Greater monkey-faced bat, P. flanneryi
  - Montane monkey-faced bat, P. pulchra
  - New Georgian monkey-faced bat, P. taki
- Genus Pteropus — flying foxes
  - P. alecto species group
    - Black flying fox, P. alecto
  - P. caniceps species group
    - Ashy-headed flying fox, P. caniceps
  - P. chrysoproctus species group
    - Silvery flying fox, P. argentatus
    - Moluccan flying fox, P. chrysoproctus
    - Makira flying fox, P. cognatus
    - Banks flying fox, P. fundatus
    - Solomons flying fox, P. rayneri
    - Rennell flying fox, P. rennelli
  - P. conspicillatus species group
    - Spectacled flying fox, P. conspicillatus
    - Ceram fruit bat, P. ocularis
  - P. livingstonii species group
    - Aru flying fox, P. aruensis
    - Kei flying fox, P. keyensis
    - Livingstone's fruit bat, P. livingstonii
    - Black-bearded flying fox, P. melanopogon
  - P. mariannus species group
    - Okinawa flying fox, P. loochoensis
    - Mariana fruit bat, P. mariannus
    - Pelew flying fox, P. pelewensis
    - Kosrae flying fox, P. ualanus
    - Yap flying fox, P. yapensis
  - P. melanotus species group
    - Black-eared flying fox, P. melanotus
  - P. molossinus species group
    - Lombok flying fox, P. lombocensis
    - Caroline flying fox, P. molossinus
    - Rodrigues flying fox, P. rodricensis
  - P. neohibernicus species group
    - Great flying fox, P. neohibernicus
  - P. niger species group
    - Aldabra flying fox, P. aldabrensis
    - Mauritian flying fox, P. niger
    - Madagascan flying fox, P. rufus
    - Seychelles fruit bat, P. seychellensis
    - Pemba flying fox, P. voeltzkowi
  - P. personatus species group
    - Bismark masked flying fox, P. capistratus
    - Masked flying fox, Pteropus personatus
    - Temminck's flying fox, P. temminckii
  - P. poliocephalus species group
    - Big-eared flying fox, P. macrotis
    - Geelvink Bay flying fox, P. pohlei
    - Grey-headed flying fox, P. poliocephalus
  - P. pselaphon species group
    - Chuuk flying fox, P. insularis
    - Temotu flying fox, P. nitendiensis
    - Large Palau flying fox, P. pilosus (19th century †)
    - Bonin flying fox, P. pselaphon
    - Guam flying fox, P. tokudae (1970s †)
    - Insular flying fox, P. tonganus
    - Vanikoro flying fox, P. tuberculatus
    - New Caledonia flying fox, P. vetulus
  - P. samoensis species group
    - Vanuatu flying fox, P. anetianus
    - Samoa flying fox, P. samoensis
  - P. scapulatus species group
    - Gilliard's flying fox, P. gilliardorum
    - Lesser flying fox, P. mahaganus
    - Little red flying fox, P. scapulatus
    - Dwarf flying fox, P. woodfordi
  - P. subniger species group
    - Admiralty flying fox, P. admiralitatum
    - Dusky flying fox, P. brunneus (19th century †)
    - Ryukyu flying fox, P. dasymallus
    - Nicobar flying fox, P. faunulus
    - Gray flying fox, P. griseus
    - Ontong Java flying fox, P. howensis
    - Small flying fox, P. hypomelanus
    - Ornate flying fox, P. ornatus
    - Little golden-mantled flying fox, P. pumilus
    - Philippine gray flying fox, P. speciosus
    - Small Mauritian flying fox, P. subniger (19th century †)
  - P. vampyrus species group
    - Indian flying fox, P. giganteus
    - Andersen's flying fox, P. intermedius
    - Lyle's flying fox, P. lylei
    - Large flying fox, P. vampyrus
  - incertae sedis
    - Small Samoan flying fox, P. allenorum (19th century †)
    - Large Samoan flying fox, P. coxi (19th century †)
- Genus Styloctenium
  - Mindoro stripe-faced fruit bat, S. mindorensis
  - Sulawesi stripe-faced fruit bat, S. wallacei
