= List of recently extinct bats =

This is a list of bat species that have become extinct since 1500. As of 2025 this includes 12 species and subspecies (about 0.7% of all bats), with more possibly extinct and/or critically endangered.

Conservation statuses of bats as of 2020 according to the IUCN (1,314 species in total)
1. Critically endangered (1.60%)
2. Endangered (6.30%)
3. Vulnerable (8.30%)
4. Near-threatened (6.70%)
5. Least concern (58.0%)
6. Data deficient (18.4%)
7. Extinct (0.70%)

== Extinct bat species ==
=== Pteropodidae ===
==== Pteropodinae ====
- Acerodon
  - Panay golden-crowned flying fox, Acerodon jubatus lucifer (Philippines, 1890s)
- Pteropus
  - Small Samoan flying fox, Pteropus allenorum (Samoa, 1850s)
  - Dusky flying fox, Pteropus brunneus (Percy Island, Australia, 1874)
  - Large Samoan flying fox, Pteropus coxi (Samoa, 1839–1841)
  - Large Palau flying fox, Pteropus pilosus (Palau, 1874)
  - Small Mauritian flying fox, Pteropus subniger (Mauritius, 1864-1873?)
  - Guam flying fox, Pteropus tokudae (Guam, 1968)

=== Phyllostomidae ===
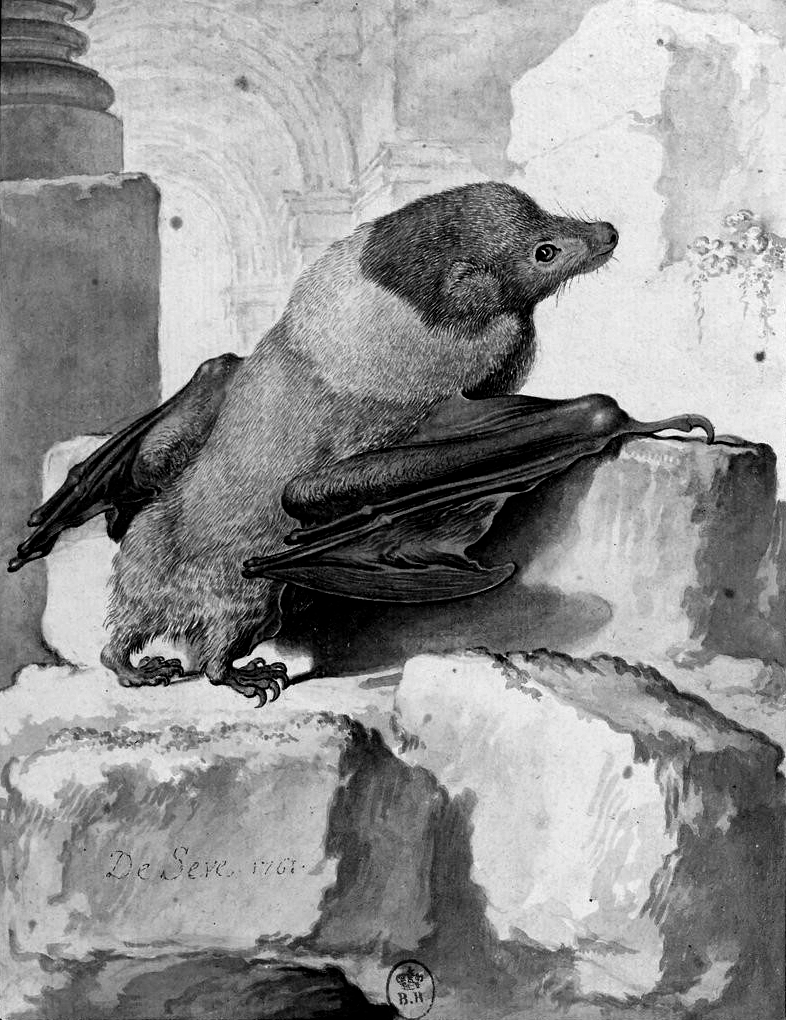
Small Mauritian flying fox

==== Desmodontinae ====
- Desmodus
  - Giant vampire bat, Desmodus draculae (Central and South America, 1650)

===== Glossophaginae =====
- Monophyllus
  - Puerto Rican long-nosed bat, Monophyllus plethodon frater (Puerto Rico, 1850-1900?)

===== Stenodermatinae =====
- Artibeus
  - Anthony's fruit-eating bat, Artibeus anthonyi (Cuba, Late Quaternary)

=== Vespertilionidae ===
==== Vespertilioninae ====
- Pipistrellus
  - Christmas Island pipistrelle, Pipistrellus murrayi (Christmas Island, Australia, 2009)
  - Sturdee's pipistrelle, Pipistrellus sturdeei (Japan, 1889)

== Possibly extinct bat species ==
=== Pteropodidae ===
==== Nyctimeninae ====
- Nyctimene
  - Nendo tube-nosed fruit bat, Nyctimene santacrucis (Solomon Islands, early 20th century?)

==== Pteropodinae ====
- Pteralopex
  - Montane monkey-faced bat, Pteralopex pulchra (Solomon Islands, 1990s)

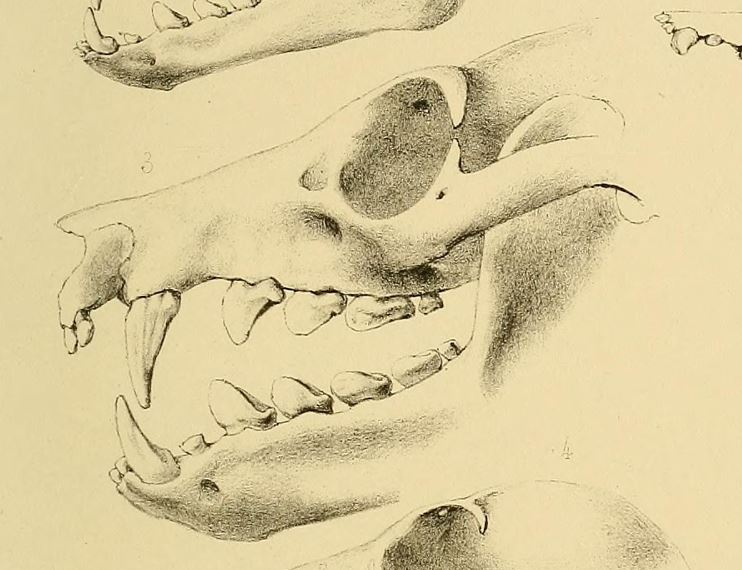
Aru flying fox skull

- Pteropus
  - Aru flying fox, Pteropus aruensis (Aru Islands, Indonesia, 19th century)
  - Okinawa flying fox, Pteropus loochoensis (Japan, Late Quaternary)

=== Mystacinidae ===
- Mystacina
  - New Zealand greater short-tailed bat, Mystacina robusta (New Zealand, 1965)

=== Vespertilionidae ===
==== Murininae ====
- Murina
  - Gloomy tube-nosed bat, Murina tenebrosa (Japan, 1962)

==== Myotinae ====
- Myotis
  - Insular myotis, Myotis insularum (Samoa, 1860s?)

==== Vespertilioninae ====
- Nyctophilus
  - Lord Howe long-eared bat, Nyctophilus howensis (Lord Howe Island, Australia, 1972)
- Scotophilus
  - Lesser yellow bat, Scotophilus borbonicus (Madagascar and Reunion, late 19th century)
