= Cynopterinae =

Scientific classification
- Kingdom: Animalia
- Phylum: Chordata
- Class: Mammalia
- Order: Chiroptera
- Family: Pteropodidae
- Subfamily: Cynopterinae

Subfamily of bats

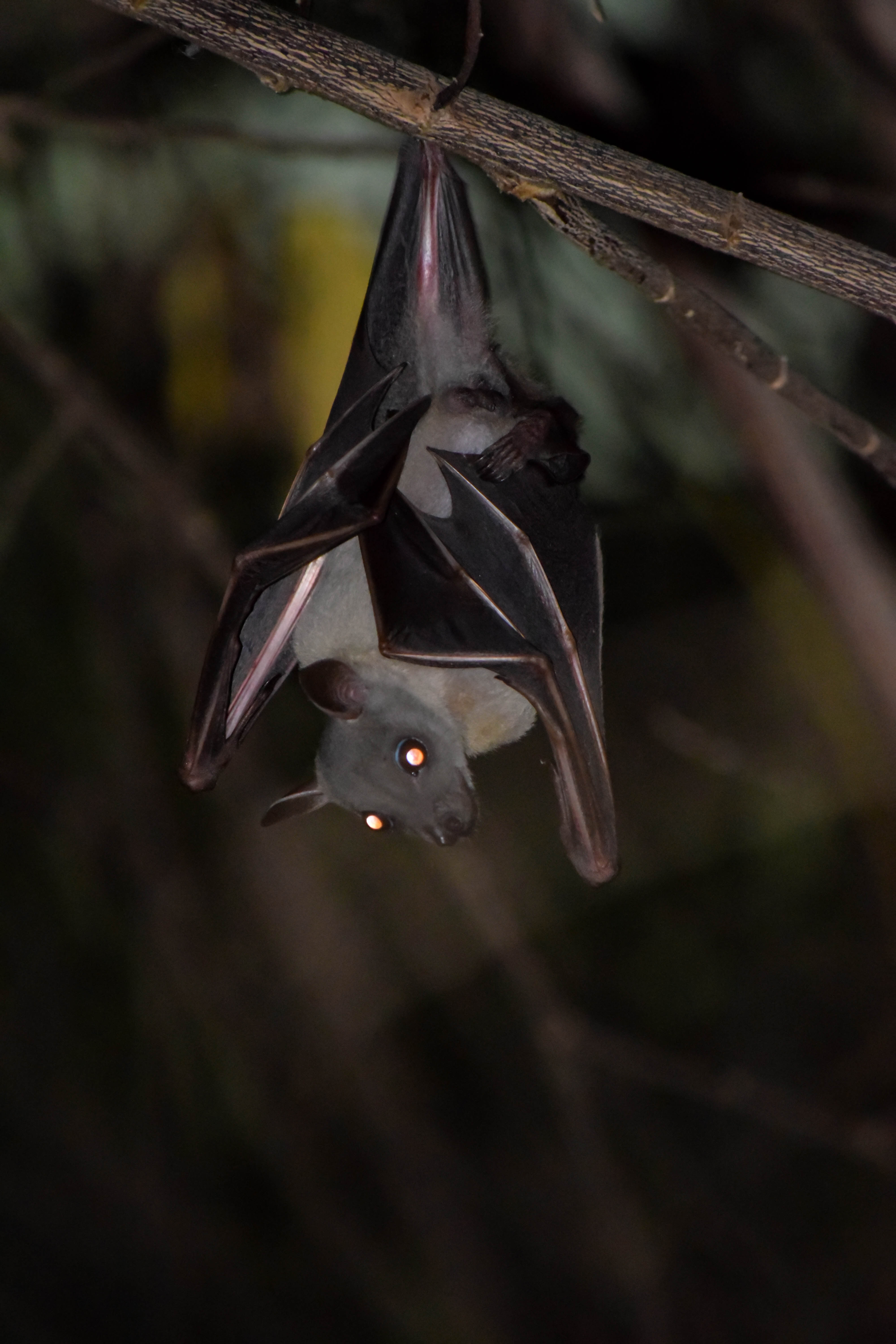
A Lesser Short-nosed fruit bat, photographed in IISER Tirupati, Mangalam Campus.

The subfamily Cynopterinae ("flying dogs") comprises 24 species of pteropodid bats distributed exclusively in South and Southeast Asia.

The subfamily contains the following genera:

- Aethalops – pygmy fruit bats
- Alionycteris
- Balionycteris
- Chironax
- Cynopterus – dog-faced fruit bats, flying dogs or short-nosed fruit bats
- Dyacopterus – Dayak fruit bats
- Haplonycteris
- Latidens
- Megaerops
- Otopteropus
- Penthetor
- Ptenochirus – musky fruit bats
- Sphaerias
- Thoopterus
