= Ontong =

Ontong is a surname. Notable people with the surname include:

- Justin Ontong (born 1980), South African cricketer
- Rodney Ontong (born 1955), former English first-class cricketer
- Shaun Ontong (born 1987), Australian football player

== See also ==
- Ontong Java Atoll or Luangiua, one of the largest atolls on earth
- Ontong Java flying fox (Pteropus howensis), a species of bat in the family Pteropodidae
- Ontong Java Plateau, a huge underwater oceanic plateau located in the Pacific Ocean, lying north of the Solomon Islands
