= Conus acrotholoides =

Scientific classification
- Kingdom: Animalia
- Phylum: Mollusca
- Class: Gastropoda
- Subclass: Caenogastropoda
- Order: Neogastropoda
- Family: Conidae
- Genus: Conus
- Species: C. acrotholoides

Binomial name
- Conus acrotholoides Tate, 1890

Extinct species of a cone snail

Conus acrotholoides is an extinct species of marine gastropod belonging to the family Conidae, commonly known as cone snails. First described by Ralph Tate in 1890, this species is known exclusively from fossil records.

This species was an offspring of Conus, Linnaeus.

== Description ==
The species was formally described as Conus acrotholoides by Tate in 1890, with further illustrations provided in 1892. As with other members of the genus Conus, it is presumed to have had a conical shell, characteristic of cone snails. However, specific morphological details of C. acrotholoides are limited due to the scarcity of well-preserved specimens.

== Distribution ==
Fossils of Conus acrotholoides have been discovered in the Port Phillip Basin of Australia, specifically within the Gellibrand Formation.

This geological formation is dated to the middle Miocene epoch, indicating that C. acrotholoides existed approximately 15 to 11 million years ago.
