= Lists of extinct species =

List of extinct species

The hierarchy of biological classification's eight major taxonomic ranks. Intermediate minor rankings are not shown.

This page features lists of species and organisms that have become extinct. The reasons for extinction range from natural occurrences, such as shifts in the Earth's ecosystem or natural disasters, to human influences on nature by hunting and destruction of natural habitats.

A species is presumed to be extinct after surveys of its expected and historical habitat demonstrate an inability to locate an individual. Species which meet this criterion but are known to be kept in captivity are extinct in the wild. If a final specimen of a moribund species is found, it is an endling.

More than 99% of all species, amounting to over 5 billion species, that ever lived on Earth are extinct.

== Plants ==
- List of recently extinct plants

== Animals ==
=== By region ===
- List of African animals extinct in the Holocene
  - List of Madagascar and Indian Ocean Island animals extinct in the Holocene
  - List of Macaronesian animals extinct in the Holocene
  - List of Saint Helena, Ascension and Tristan da Cunha animals extinct in the Holocene
- List of Asian animals extinct in the Holocene
- List of European species extinct in the Holocene
  - List of British Isles species extinct in the Holocene
  - List of mammals from the British Isles extinct since the Late Pleistocene
- List of North American animals extinct in the Holocene
  - List of Antillian and Bermudan animals extinct in the Holocene
- List of Oceanian animals extinct in the Holocene
  - List of Australia-New Guinea species extinct in the Holocene
  - List of Hawaiian animals extinct in the Holocene
  - List of New Zealand species extinct in the Holocene
- List of South American animals extinct in the Holocene
  - List of Galapagos Islands animals extinct in the Holocene

=== Fossil taxa ===
- Lists of prehistoric animals
- List of dinosaur genera
- List of fossil bird genera
- List of Late Quaternary prehistoric bird species
- List of fossil primates
- Lists of prehistoric fish

=== Recent extinction ===
- List of bird extinctions by year
- List of extinct dog breeds
- List of recently extinct amphibians
- List of recently extinct arthropods
- List of recently extinct bats
- List of recently extinct fishes
- List of recently extinct insects
- List of recently extinct invertebrates
- List of recently extinct mammals
- List of recently extinct molluscs
- List of recently extinct reptiles

== See also ==
- Category:Extinct species
- Category:Species made extinct by human activities
- Category:Species by threat
- Extinction
- Extinction event
- Endangered species
- Extinct (disambiguation)
- Lists of organisms by population
- Lists of animals
- List of lists of lists §§ Natural and physical sciences and List of lists of lists
