= Flores shrew =

Conservation status
- Endangered (IUCN 3.1)

Scientific classification
- Kingdom: Animalia
- Phylum: Chordata
- Class: Mammalia
- Order: Eulipotyphla
- Family: Soricidae
- Genus: Suncus
- Species: S. mertensi

Binomial name
- Suncus mertensi Kock, 1974
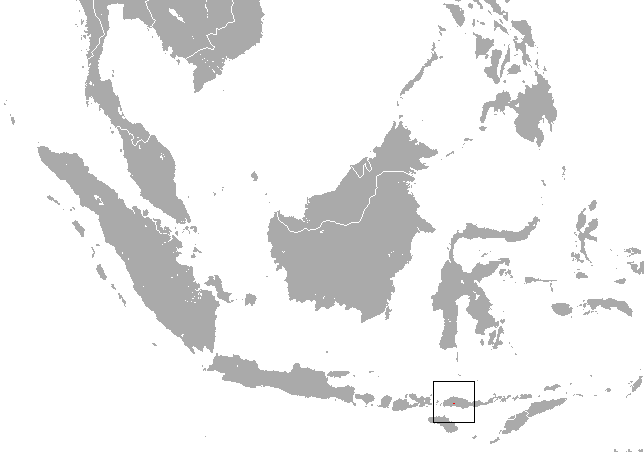
- Flores shrew range

Species of mammal

The Flores shrew (Suncus mertensi) is a white-toothed shrew found only on Flores Island, Indonesia. It is listed as an endangered species due to habitat loss and a restricted range.
