= Megaerops albicollis =

Conservation status
- Near Threatened (IUCN 3.1)

Scientific classification
- Kingdom: Animalia
- Phylum: Chordata
- Class: Mammalia
- Order: Chiroptera
- Family: Pteropodidae
- Genus: Megaerops
- Species: M. albicollis

Binomial name
- Megaerops albicollis (Francis, 1989)

Synonyms
- Megaerops wetmorei albicollis Francis, 1989

Species of bat

Megaerops albicollis is a species of megabat found in Southeast Asia, including Brunei, Malaysia, and Indonesia.

== Taxonomy ==
Megaerops albicollis was initially described as a subspecies of the Mindanao fruit bat (Megaerops wetmorei) in 1989 by mammalogist Charles M. Frances. The holotype had been collected in Pasoh Forest Reserve in Peninsular Malaysia. It had a trinomen of Megaerops wetmorei albicollis. The species name albicollis means "white collar", and references its fur coloration.

Frances noted that M. wetmorei albicollis appeared distinct enough to warrant full species status, but he chose to be conservative and describe it as a subspecies due to the small sample size he had available. Later genetic research showed that the Mindanao fruit bat was more similar to members of Ptenochirus and distinct from M. w. albicollis. The Mindanao fruit bat was thus revised to the name Ptenochirus wetmorei, with M. albicollis elevated from a subspecies to a full species.

== Description ==
Megaerops albicollis has creamy, light brown fur and a white ruff around its neck. The tail is absent or very short, with a length of less than 4 mm (0.16 in).

== Range ==
Megaerops albicollis is found in Southeast Asia, including the islands of Borneo and Sumatra, as well as Peninsular Malaysia. It is found in forested areas from 0–1,100 m (0–3,609 ft) above sea level.
