= Dieter Kock =

- Born: 16 January 1937; Poznań, Poland
- Died: 21 November 2018 (aged 81)
- Education: Justus Liebig University Giessen
- Known for: Research on bats and African mammals
- Scientific career
- Fields: Mammalogy, zoology
- Workplaces: Senckenberg Museum

Dieter Kock (16 January 1937 – 21 November 2018) was a German mammalogist who specialised primarily in bats and African mammals.

== Biography ==
Kock studied at Justus Liebig University Giessen after completing his secondary education. His principal subjects were biology, physics and chemistry, while his subsidiary subjects included veterinary medicine, geography and plant protection. In 1968, he received a doctorate in natural sciences in zoology for his dissertation Die Fledermaus-Fauna des Sudan (Mammalia, Chiroptera) (The Bat Fauna of Sudan), supervised by Wulf Emmo Ankel.

Kock undertook numerous collecting expeditions during his career. His destinations included Tunisia on several occasions from 1959 onwards; Sudan from 1960 to 1963; Colombia in 1966; East Africa from 1969 to 1971 and in 1975; Turkey and the Aegean Sea region from 1971 to 1973 and in 1978; French Guiana in 1985; the Middle East from 1988 to 1989 and in 1992; and Saudi Arabia in 1992. These expeditions contributed to his research on mammalian diversity and distribution.

Kock also worked as a consultant for the Deutsche Gesellschaft für Technische Zusammenarbeit (GTZ), undertaking assignments in Kenya from 1969 to 1971, Morocco from 1975 to 1976, Iran in 1975, Niger in 1976, Portugal in 1979, Bangladesh in 1981 and Burma in 1987. His work in these countries focused particularly on surveying populations of pest rodents and developing plant-protection measures.

In Germany, Kock worked as a scientific staff member at the Senckenberg Museum from 1971, becoming a permanent employee in October 1973. He remained there until 2002. His research focused on mammalian taxonomy and zoogeography, particularly bats and their ectoparasites. He also participated in nature-conservation and environmental-protection initiatives. His activities included serving on the advisory board for the Convention on International Trade in Endangered Species of Wild Fauna and Flora (CITES) at the Federal Agency for Nature Conservation in Bonn, acting as an alternate member of the nature-conservation advisory council of the Darmstadt Regional Council, and participating in the Working Group for Bat Conservation in Hesse.

Kock published more than 200 scientific papers. His taxonomic contributions included descriptions of the species Phyllomys pattoni and Suncus mertensi; the Mindanao pygmy fruit bat, Alionycteris paucidentata, and its monotypic genus Alionycteris; Otopteropus cartilagonodus and its monotypic genus Otopteropus; the subspecies Pteropus anetianus motalavae and Pteropus anetianus pastoris; Pteropus fundatus; the Comoro rousette, Rousettus obliviosus; Rhinolophus maendeleo; Rhinolophus ziama; Hipposideros hypophyllus; Hipposideros orbiculus; Hipposideros rotalis; the subspecies Rhinopoma microphyllum asirensis; Nycteris thebaica najdiya; Arielulus aureocollaris; Neoromicia nanus meesteri; and the subspecies Civettictis civetta pauli of the African civet. His publications contributed to the documentation and classification of mammals from several regions of the world.

From 1974 to 1996, Kock collaborated with Derek W. Yalden and Malcolm J. Largen on the seven-volume Catalogue of the Mammals of Ethiopia, a major reference work on the mammals of Ethiopia.

From 1977 to 1992, Kock served as editor of the scientific journal Senckenbergiana biologica.

== Eponyms ==
In 2005, Australian mammalogist Meredith Happold named the Kock's mouse-eared bat (Myotis dieteri), from the Republic of the Congo, in honour of Kock.
