= Barbara Lawrence (zoologist) =

American zoologist (1909–1997)

- Born: July 30, 1909; Boston, Massachusetts
- Died: 1997 (aged 87–88)
- Education: Vassar College
- Spouse: William E. Schevill
- Scientific career
- Fields: Paleozoology; Mammalogy
- Workplaces: Harvard University Museum of Comparative Zoology
- Author abbrev. (zoology): Lawrence

Barbara Lawrence (July 30, 1909 – 1997), sometimes known as Barbara Lawrence Schevill, was an American paleozoologist and mammalogist known for her studies of canids, porpoises and howler monkeys and her work as the mammal curator at Harvard University's Museum of Comparative Zoology (MCZ).

== Early life and education ==
Lawrence was born on July 30, 1909, in Boston to Theodora (née Eldredge) and Harris Hooper Lawrence, their third child. She married William E. Schevill on December 23, 1938, while still attending Vassar College, where she was awarded a bachelor's degree in 1931. Barbara Lawrence lived in the city of Concord, Massachusetts when she was younger.

== Career and research ==
After taking a position as the Curator of Mammals at the MCZ, she took her first trip to do field research on the howler monkeys of East Africa, where she returned on other trips. In 1936 and 1937, she traveled to the Philippines and Sumatra to study bats. She collaborated with her husband, William Schevill, on studies of cetacean communication and echolocation, where they made the first recordings of porpoise and whale calls, forming in many ways the founding framework for “literally hundreds of scientific studies produced by other workers from the 1960s until the present day." While working at Harvard, she pioneered the practice of collecting full skeletons of mammals. She also traveled to Nyasaland (modern-day Malawi) in her field studies of mammals. Lawrence did field work in New Mexico and Iraq on the evolution of domesticated animals, and later went to Turkey to study fossil dogs there. She was especially known for her work in canids: her 1967 collaboration with William Bossert on the genus Canis was noted for its innovative application of statistics to evolutionary and ecological questions.

== Legacy ==
Barbara Lawrence died in 1997, three years after her husband's death and survived by her daughter, Lee, and son, Edward. The Society of Ethnobiology awards the Lawrence Award each year to a promising graduate student in ethnobiology.
