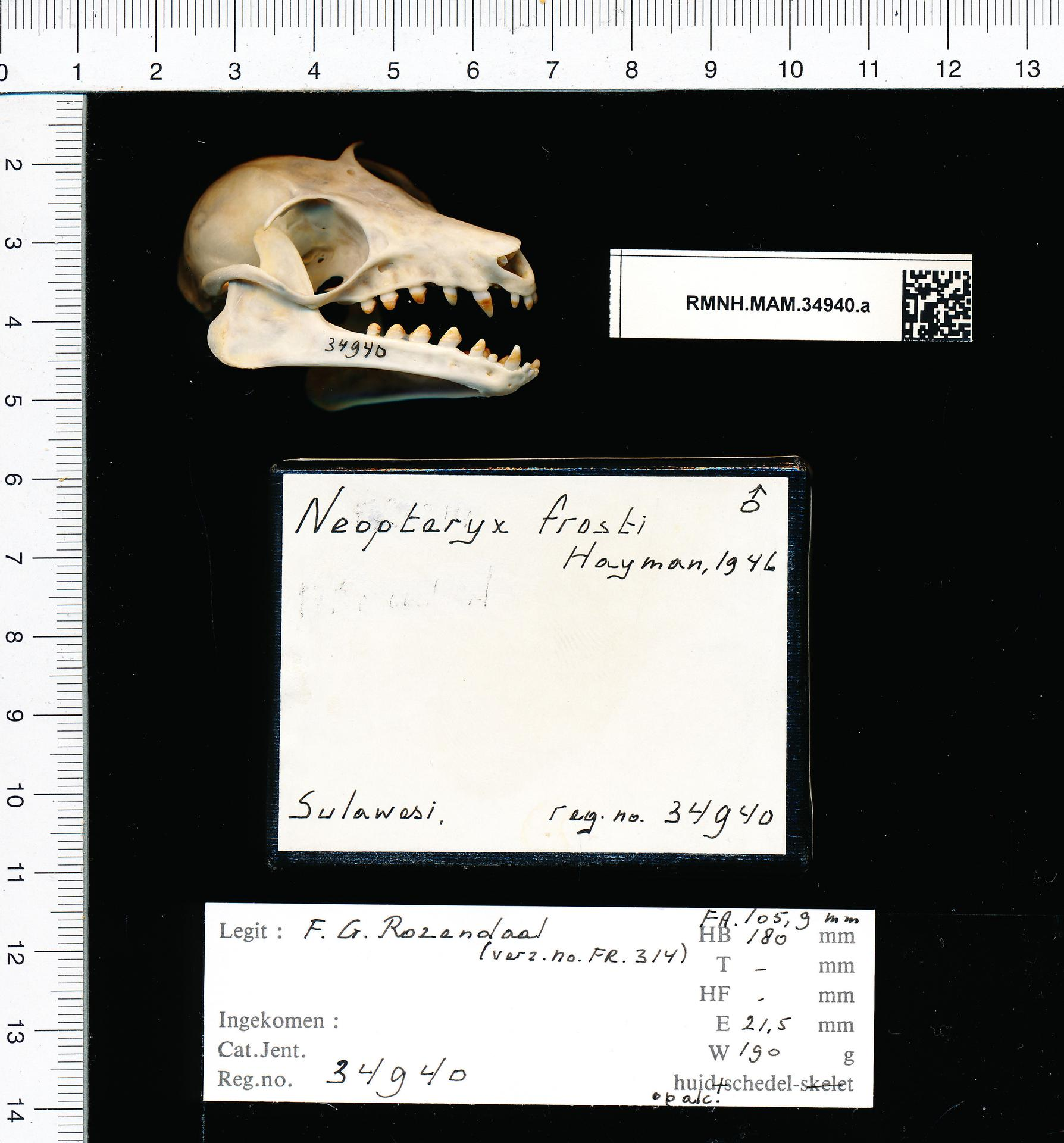

Conservation status
- Endangered (IUCN 3.1)

Scientific classification
- Kingdom: Animalia
- Phylum: Chordata
- Class: Mammalia
- Order: Chiroptera
- Family: Pteropodidae
- Genus: Neopteryx; Hayman, 1946
- Species: N. frosti

Binomial name
- Neopteryx frosti Hayman, 1946
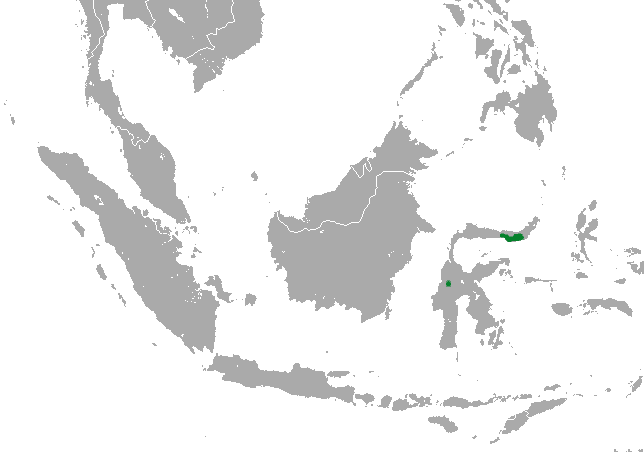
- Small-toothed fruit bat range on Sulawesi.

= Small-toothed fruit bat =

Species of bat

The small-toothed fruit bat or small-toothed flying fox (Neopteryx frosti) is a species of megabat in the family Pteropodidae. It is the only species within the genus Neopteryx. It is endemic to central Indonesia. It is known only from two localities on Sulawesi island. Its natural habitat is subtropical and tropical dry forests.

== Weights and Measurements ==
Bergmans and Rozendaal (1988) gave the measurements of 3 new specimens of N. frosti as well as the holotype details as given by Hayman (1946). The holotype is a female (adult, BMNH 40.691.k) and the 3 new specimens presented in the study are known as : RMNH 34939 (adult female), RMNH 34940 (adult male, and the one pictured on this page) and ZMA 22.770 (an immature male). Forearm length ranged from 110 to 110.6 mm in the holotype and female 34939 while it measured 104.9 mm in the adult male (34940) and 96.1 mm in the immature male (ZMA 22.770). The RMNH adults (34939, pregnant female; 34940, male) weighed 250 g and 190 g respectively. The immature male weighed 164 g.

== Conservation ==
It is listed as an Endangered species on the IUCN Red List, due to continued habitat decline and intense hunting.

== See also ==
- Bats of Indonesia
- Endemic fauna of Indonesia
