= Mindanao fruit bat =

Conservation status
- Vulnerable (IUCN 3.1)

Scientific classification
- Kingdom: Animalia
- Phylum: Chordata
- Class: Mammalia
- Infraclass: Placentalia
- Order: Chiroptera
- Family: Pteropodidae
- Genus: Ptenochirus
- Species: P. wetmorei

Binomial name
- Ptenochirus wetmorei Taylor, 1934
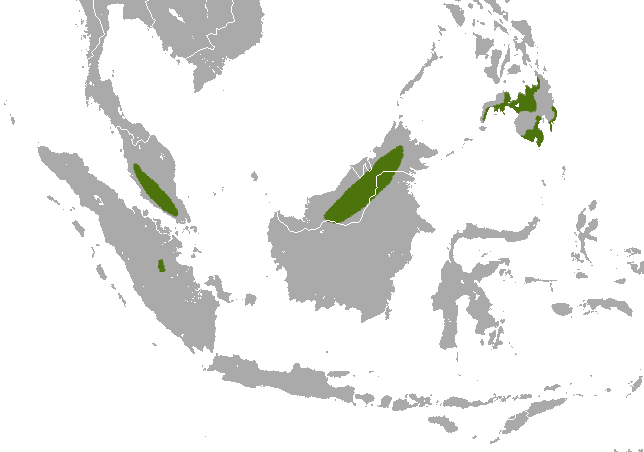
- White-collared fruit bat range

Species of bat

The Mindanao fruit bat (Ptenochirus wetmorei) is a species of megabat found in Southeast Asia. It was previously included in Megaerops as the white-collared fruit bat, but was split into P. wetmorei and M. albicollis, with the latter retaining the common name.

A specimen held by Brunei Museum (BM87/1983) had a forearm length of 48 millimetres (1.9 in), a head-body length of 65 millimetres (2.6 in), ears 12 millimetres (0.47 in) long, hind feet 8 millimetres (0.31 in) long and weighed 16 grams (0.56 oz).
