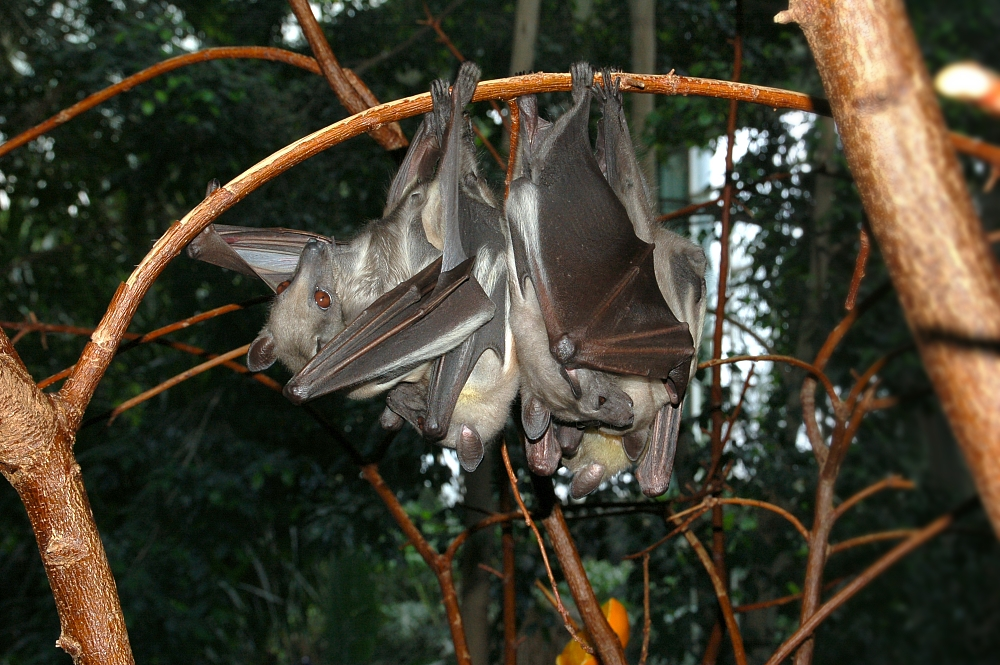
- Straw-coloured fruit bat (Eidolon helvum)

Scientific classification
- Kingdom: Animalia
- Phylum: Chordata
- Class: Mammalia
- Order: Chiroptera
- Family: Pteropodidae
- Subfamily: Eidolinae
- Genus: Eidolon; Rafinesque, 1815

Type species
- Vespertilio vampirus helvus Kerr, 1792

Species
- See text

= Eidolon (bat) =

Genus of bats

Eidolon (known as the palm bat) is a genus of megabats in the family Pteropodidae. It contains two species:

- Madagascan fruit bat, Eidolon dupreanum
- Straw-coloured fruit bat, Eidolon helvum
