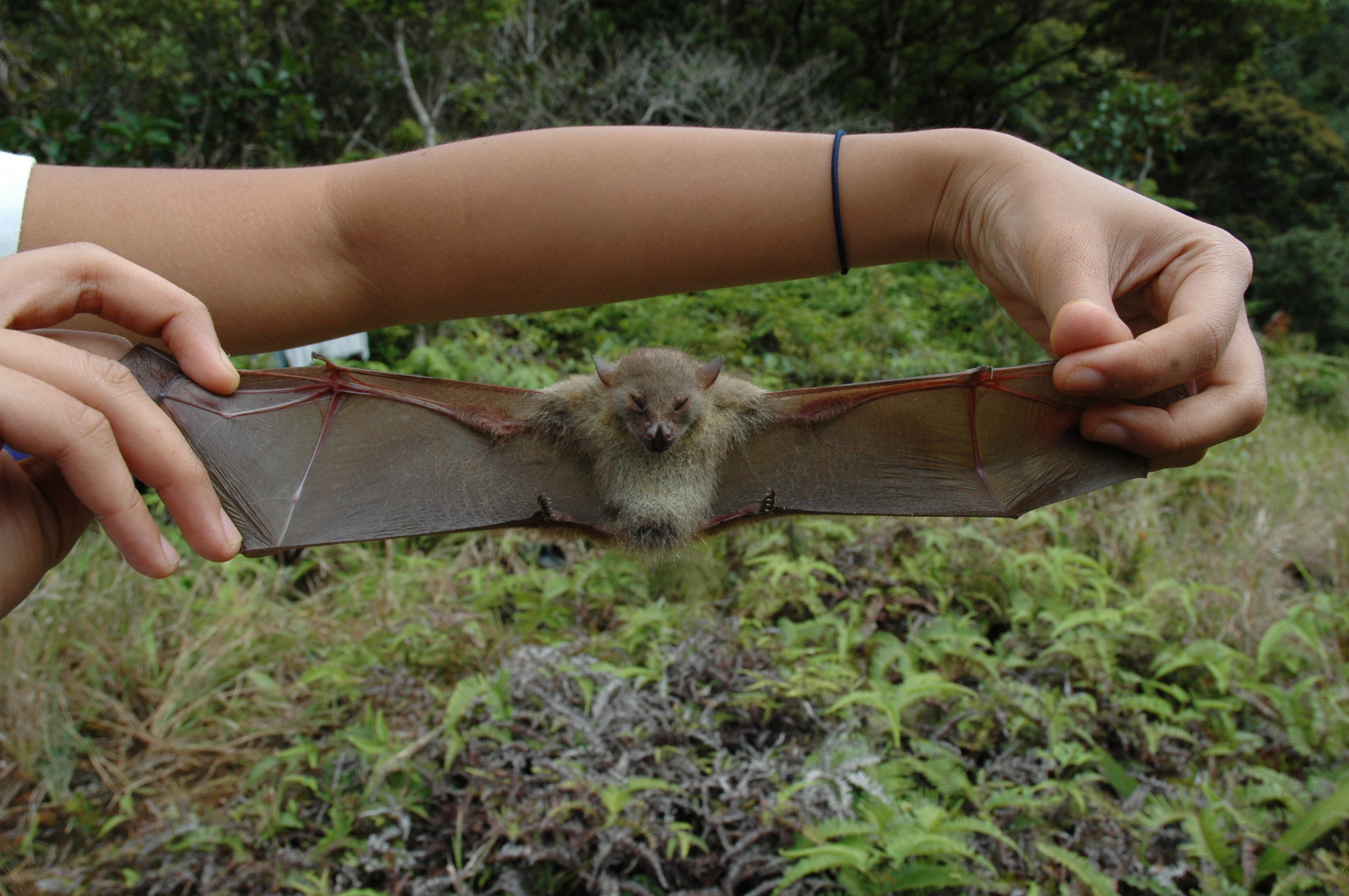

Conservation status
- Least Concern (IUCN 3.1)

Scientific classification
- Kingdom: Animalia
- Phylum: Chordata
- Class: Mammalia
- Order: Chiroptera
- Family: Pteropodidae
- Genus: Haplonycteris; Lawrence, 1939
- Species: H. fischeri

Binomial name
- Haplonycteris fischeri Lawrence, 1939
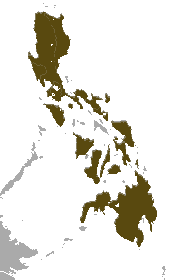
- Fischer's pygmy fruit bat range

= Fischer's pygmy fruit bat =

Species of bat

The Fischer's pygmy fruit bat or Philippine pygmy fruit bat (Haplonycteris fischeri) is a species of megabat in the family Pteropodidae. It is monotypic within the genus Haplonycteris. It is endemic to the Philippines. Its natural habitat is subtropical or tropical dry forests.
