= Philippine gray flying fox =

Conservation status
- Data Deficient (IUCN 3.1)

Scientific classification
- Kingdom: Animalia
- Phylum: Chordata
- Class: Mammalia
- Order: Chiroptera
- Family: Pteropodidae
- Genus: Pteropus
- Species: P. speciosus

Binomial name
- Pteropus speciosus K. Andersen, 1908
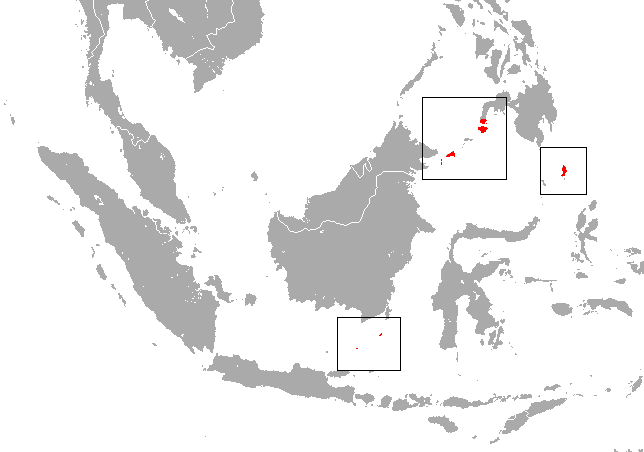
- Philippine gray flying fox range

Species of bat

The Philippine gray flying fox (Pteropus speciosus) is a species of flying fox in the family Pteropodidae. It is found in Indonesia and the Philippines. Its natural habitat is subtropical or tropical dry forests.
