= Geelvink Bay flying fox =

Conservation status
- Vulnerable (IUCN 3.1)

Scientific classification
- Kingdom: Animalia
- Phylum: Chordata
- Class: Mammalia
- Order: Chiroptera
- Family: Pteropodidae
- Genus: Pteropus
- Species: P. pohlei

Binomial name
- Pteropus pohlei Stein, 1933
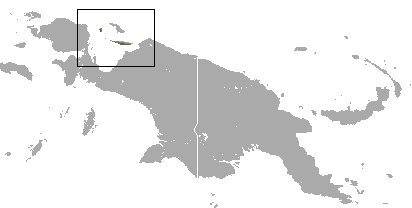
- Geelvink Bay flying fox range

Species of bat

The Geelvink Bay flying fox or Geelvink Bay fruit bat (Pteropus pohlei) is a species of flying fox in the family Pteropodidae. It is endemic to the islands of Yapen, Numfor, and Rani, which lie north of New Guinea in Indonesia's Papua Province. The name comes from Geelvink Bay, now Cenderawasih Bay.

It is common over a small area, and the population trend is decreasing. Major threats to the species are loss of habitat due to timber harvesting, and hunting.
