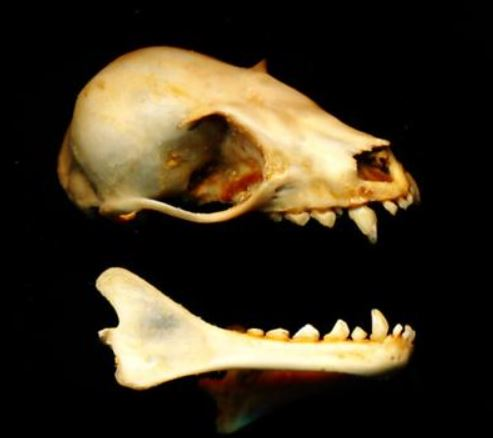

Conservation status
- Least Concern (IUCN 3.1)

Scientific classification
- Kingdom: Animalia
- Phylum: Chordata
- Class: Mammalia
- Order: Chiroptera
- Family: Pteropodidae
- Genus: Sphaerias; Miller, 1906
- Species: S. blanfordi

Binomial name
- Sphaerias blanfordi (Thomas, 1891)
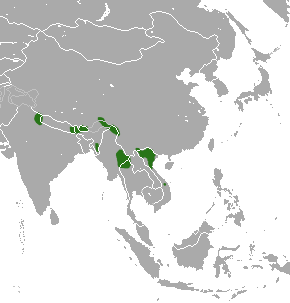
- Blanford's fruit bat range

Synonyms
- Cynopterus blanfordi Thomas, 1891

= Blanford's fruit bat =

Species of bat

Blanford's fruit bat (Sphaerias blanfordi) is a mountain species of megabat. It is found in several countries in South and Southeast Asia.

== Taxonomy ==
Blanford's fruit bat was described as a new species in 1891 by English zoologist Oldfield Thomas, who put it in the genus Cynopterus (C. blanfordi). The eponym for its specific epithet "blanfordi" is English naturalist William Thomas Blanford.

In 1906, American zoologist Gerrit Smith Miller Jr. proposed the new genus Sphaerias. He justified the inclusion of C. blanfordi in this genus as opposed to Cynopterus due to its lack of a calcar and the development of the incisors, whose shape he called "peculiar".

== Range and habitat ==
It occurs in several countries in South and Southeast Asia, including Bhutan, China, India, Myanmar, Nepal, Thailand, and Vietnam. In 2010, it was documented in Laos for the first time. It has been documented at a range of elevations from 308–2,710 m (1,010–8,891 ft) above sea level.

== Conservation ==
As of 2021, it is listed as a least-concern species by the IUCN. It meets the criteria for this designation due to its large geographic range and presumably large population size. Additionally, it is unlikely to be experiencing rapid population decline. The IUCN listed no major threats to the species, but the first record of it in Laos was an individual sold as bushmeat at a market.
