= Ontong Java flying fox =

Conservation status
- Critically Endangered (IUCN 3.1)

Scientific classification
- Kingdom: Animalia
- Phylum: Chordata
- Class: Mammalia
- Order: Chiroptera
- Family: Pteropodidae
- Genus: Pteropus
- Species: P. howensis

Binomial name
- Pteropus howensis Troughton, 1931
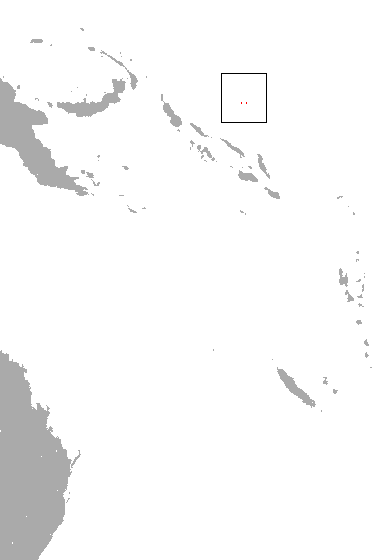
- Ontong Java flying fox range

Species of mammal

The Ontong Java flying fox (Pteropus howensis) is a species of flying fox in the family Pteropodidae. It is endemic to the Ontong Java Atoll in the Solomon Islands. Its natural habitats are subtropical or tropical dry forests and subtropical or tropical swamps. It was classified as "Critically Endangered" in 2021 by the IUCN . Its confirmed range extends only over small islands, all of which are near to sea level. It is threatened by rising sea levels.
