= Small Samoan flying fox =

Conservation status
- Extinct (IUCN 3.1)

Scientific classification
- Kingdom: Animalia
- Phylum: Chordata
- Class: Mammalia
- Order: Chiroptera
- Family: Pteropodidae
- Genus: Pteropus
- Species: †P. allenorum

Binomial name
- †Pteropus allenorum K. M. Helgen, L. Helgen & Wilson, 2009

Extinct species of bat

The small Samoan flying fox (Pteropus allenorum) is a species of fruit-eating megabat whose type specimen was originally collected in Samoa in 1856, but was not identified as a new species until 2009. Its wingspan was at least two feet, and it weighed around 8 oz. As the type specimen is dead, and no other examples of the species are known, it is believed to be extinct.

It is known from only a single specimen collected in 1856 on the island of Upolu in Samoa. The species is believed to have gone extinct during the 19th century due to a combination of overhunting by humans and habitat destruction from agriculture.
