= Demonic tube-nosed fruit bat =

Conservation status
- Data Deficient (IUCN 3.1)

Scientific classification
- Kingdom: Animalia
- Phylum: Chordata
- Class: Mammalia
- Order: Chiroptera
- Family: Pteropodidae
- Genus: Nyctimene
- Species: N. masalai

Binomial name
- Nyctimene masalai Smith & Hood, 1983
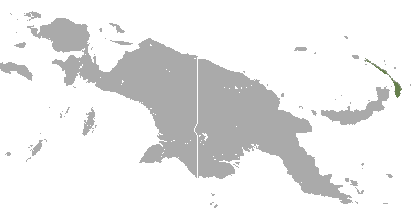
- Demonic tube-nosed fruit bat range

Species of bat

The demonic tube-nosed fruit bat (Nyctimene masalai) is a species of bat in the family Pteropodidae. It is endemic to Papua New Guinea. The holotype specimen was collected in 1979 on New Ireland, in the Bismarck Archipelago. It was described as a new species in 1983. The range of the species may extend to other islands, however the extent of the range is not presently known.

== Taxonomy and etymology ==
Based on its morphology, it was placed into the cephalotes species group of its genus when it was described. Species groups are hypotheses of evolutionary relationships, so it is thought that the demonic tube-nosed fruit bat is most closely related to the other members of the species group:

- Pallas's tube-nosed bat, (N. cephalotes)
- Island tube-nosed fruit bat, (N. major)
- Eastern tube-nosed bat, (N. robinsoni)
- Nendo tube-nosed fruit bat, (N. santacrucis)
- Umboi tube-nosed fruit bat, (N. vizcaccia)

More recently, others have placed it in the albiventer species group. Other members of the albiventer group included in this study were:

- Common tube-nosed fruit bat, (N. albiventer)
- Island tube-nosed fruit bat, (N. major)
- Umboi tube-nosed fruit bat, (N. vizcaccia)
- Dragon tube-nosed fruit bat, (N. draconilla)
- Malaita tube-nosed fruit bat, (N. malaitensis)

The specific epithet comes from the Tolai word "masalai", which Smith and Hood translate as "forest demon or devil". Some sources place the demonic tube-nosed fruit bat as synonymous with the common tube-nosed fruit bat, Nyctimene albiventer.

== Description ==
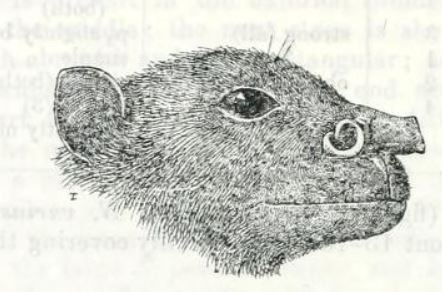
An example of the long, tubular nostrils in Nyctimene major

Bats of the Nyctimene genus are distinguished by their elongated, tubular nostrils. Individual bats are 94–103 mm (3.7–4.1 in) long. They weigh 45.2–52.3 g (1.59–1.84 oz). The forearm is 63.5–67.5 mm (2.50–2.66 in) long. The back is mottled reddish-brown, with a thin, 5 mm (0.20 in) black stripe running from the back of the head to the base of the tail. Hairs on the dorsal side of the body are long, at 8–9 mm (0.31–0.35 in) long. The ventral side is grayish-white with a yellowish-brown tint. The flight membranes are dark brown. The wings have pale yellowish-brown spots, while the ears have white spots. The forearm also has large white splotches. The nostrils are whitish. Its snout is short and narrow and its dental formula is 1.1.3.10.1.3.2, for a total of 24 teeth.

== Biology ==
Its diet consists of fruit.

== Range and status ==
So far, it is only known from New Ireland, in the Bismarck Archipelago, which is part of Papua New Guinea. It is possible that its range includes other islands in the Bismarck Archipelago, though this is currently unconfirmed. Members of this species identified so far have been found at 0–10 m (0–33 ft) above sea level.

It is currently evaluated as data deficient by the IUCN. Previously in 1996, the IUCN had assessed this species as vulnerable. There has been little research regarding this species, and its population trend and geographic range are unknown. It is unknown if there are any threats to this species.
