= List of mammals of Timor-Leste =

This is a list of mammals found in East Timor.

The following tags are used to highlight each species' conservation status as assessed by the International Union for Conservation of Nature:

EX	Extinct	No reasonable doubt that the last individual has died.
EW	Extinct in the wild	Known only to survive in captivity or as a naturalized populations well outside its previous range.
CR	Critically endangered	The species is in imminent risk of extinction in the wild.
EN	Endangered	The species is facing an extremely high risk of extinction in the wild.
VU	Vulnerable	The species is facing a high risk of extinction in the wild.
NT	Near threatened	The species does not meet any of the criteria that would categorise it as risking extinction but it is likely to do so in the future.
LC	Least concern	There are no current identifiable risks to the species.
DD	Data deficient	There is inadequate information to make an assessment of the risks to this species.

== Order: Chiroptera ==
- Family: Hipposideridae
  - Genus: Hipposideros
    - Timor roundleaf bat, H. crumeniferus DD
- Family: Pteropodidae
  - Genus: Acerodon
    - Sunda flying fox, Acerodon mackloti VU
  - Genus: Cynopterus
      - Lesser short-nosed fruit bat, C. brachyotis LC
    - Nusatenggara short-nosed fruit bat, Cynopterus nusatenggara LC
    - Indonesian short-nosed fruit bat, Cynopterus titthaecheilus LC
  - Genus: Dobsonia
    - Moluccan naked-backed fruit bat, Dobsonia moluccensis LC
    - Western naked-backed fruit bat, Dobsonia peronii LC
  - Genus: Eonycteris
    - Cave nectar bat, Eonycteris spelaea LC
  - Genus: Macroglossus
    - Long-tongued nectar bat, Macroglossus minimus LC
  - Genus: Nyctimene
    - Pallas's tube-nosed bat, Nyctimene cephalotes LC possibly extirpated
    - Keast's tube-nosed fruit bat, Nyctimene keasti LC
  - Genus: Pteropus
    - Gray flying fox, Pteropus griseus DD
    - Lombok flying fox, Pteropus lombocensis DD
    - Large flying fox, Pteropus vampyrus NT
  - Genus: Rousettus
    - Geoffroy's rousette, Rousettus amplexicaudatus LC
- Family: Rhinolophidae
  - Genus: Rhinolophus
    - Broad-eared horseshoe bat, Rhinolophus euryotis LC
    - Insular horseshoe bat, Rhinolophus keyensis DD
    - Woolly horseshoe bat, Rhinolophus luctus LC
    - Large-eared horseshoe bat, Rhinolophus philippinensis LC

== Order: Diprotodontia ==
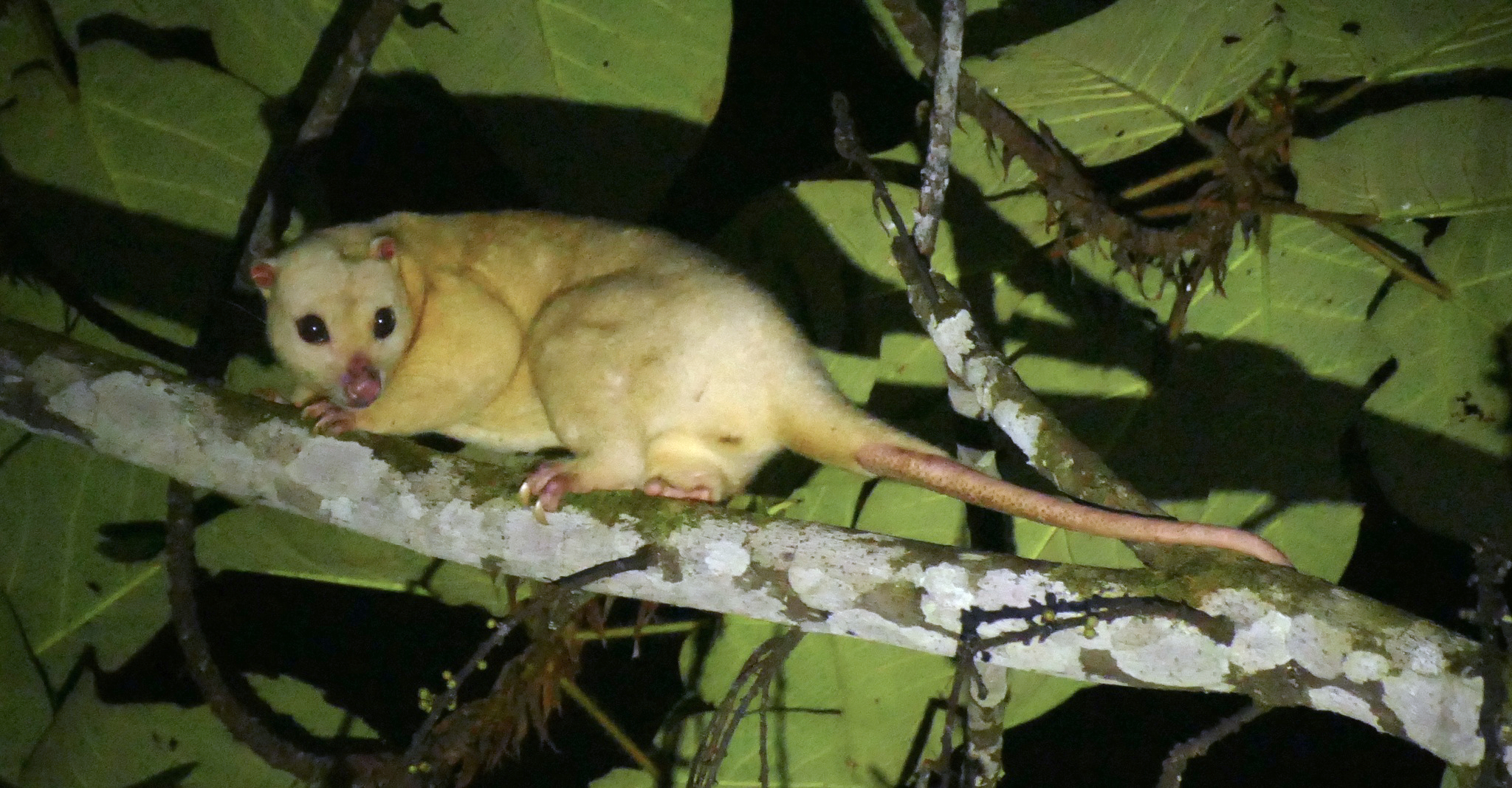
Northern common cuscus

- Family: Phalangeridae
  - Genus: Phalanger
    - Northern common cuscus, Phalanger orientalis LC

== Order: Primates ==
- Family: Cercopithecidae

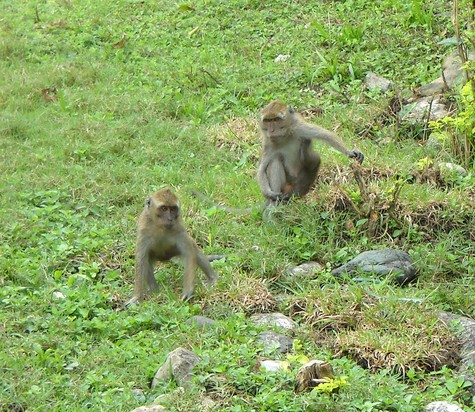
Crab-eating macaques in Same

  - Genus: Macaca
    - Crab-eating macaque, Macaca fascicularis LC

== Order: Rodentia ==
- Family: Muridae
  - Genus: Rattus
    - Timor rat, R. timorensis DD

== Order: Sirenia ==
- Family: Dugongidae
  - Genus: Dugong
    - Dugong, Dugong dugon VU

== Order Soricomorpha ==
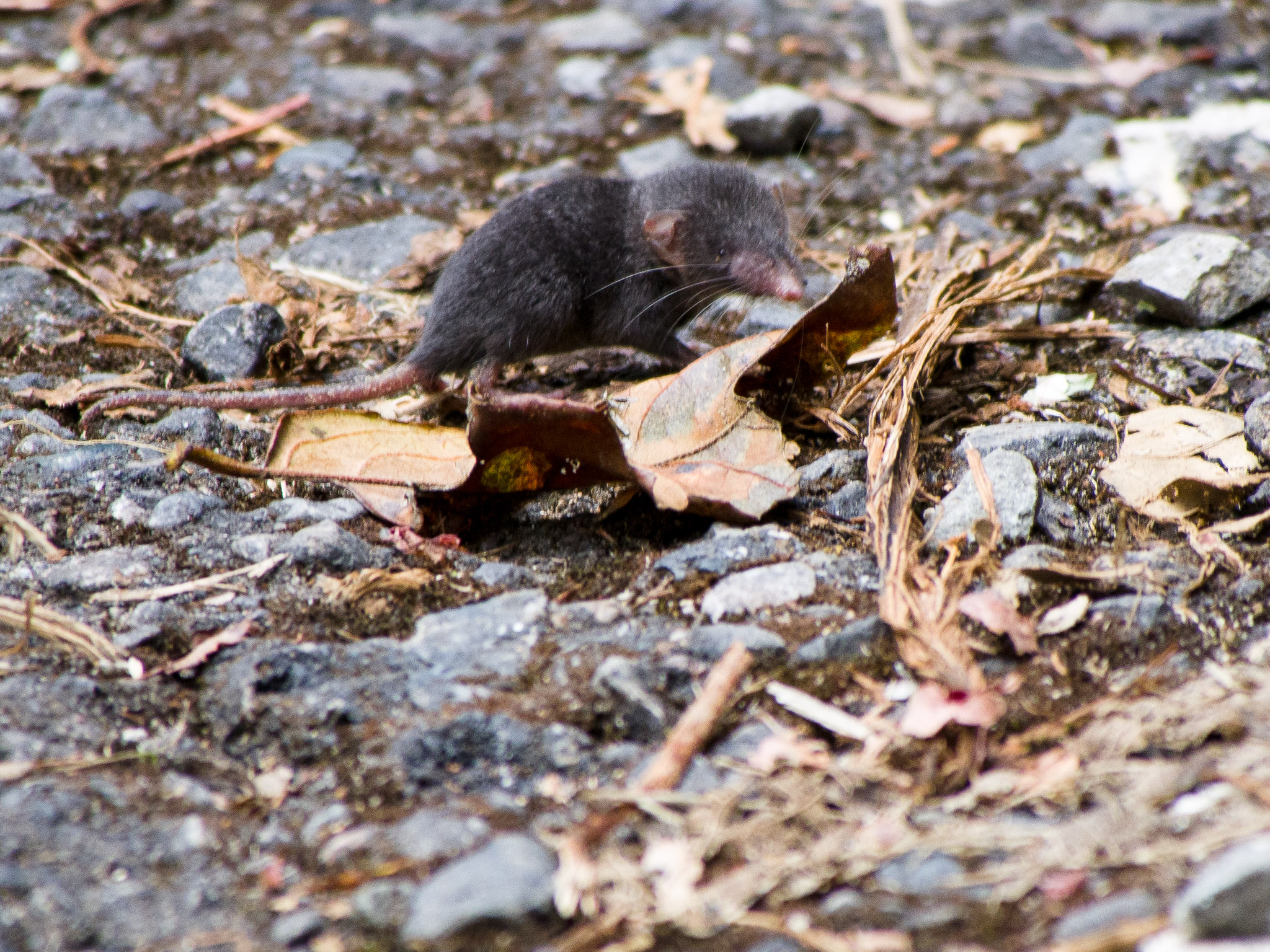
Sunda shrew

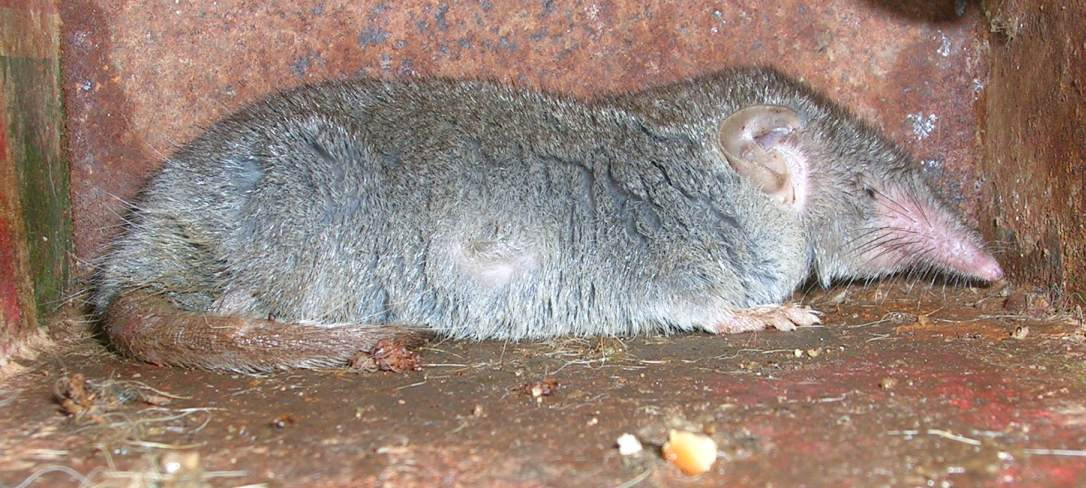
Asian house shrew

- Family: Soricidae
  - Genus: Crocidura
    - Javanese shrew, Crocidura maxi LC
    - Sunda shrew, Crocidura monticola LC
    - Timor shrew, Crocidura tenuis DD
  - Genus: Suncus
    - Asian house shrew, Suncus murinus LC

== Order: Cetacea ==
The order Cetacea includes whales, dolphins and porpoises. They are the mammals most fully adapted to aquatic life with a spindle-shaped nearly hairless body, protected by a thick layer of blubber, and forelimbs and tail modified to provide propulsion underwater.

- Suborder: Mysticeti
  - Family Balaenopteridae
    - Genus: Balaenoptera
      - Common minke whale, Balaenoptera acutorostrata LC
      - Sei whale, Balaenoptera borealis EN
      - Bryde's whale, Balaenoptera edeni DD
      - Blue whale, Balaenoptera musculus EN
      - Fin whale, Balaenoptera physalus EN
    - Genus: Megaptera
      - Humpback whale, Megaptera novaeangliae LC
- Suborder: Odontoceti
  - Family: Delphinidae
    - Genus: Delphinus
      - Short-beaked common dolphin, Delphinus delphis LC
    - Genus: Feresa
      - Pygmy killer whale, Feresa attenuata DD
    - Genus: Globicephala
      - Short-finned pilot whale, Globicephala macrorhynchus DD
    - Genus: Grampus
      - Risso's dolphin, Grampus griseus LC
    - Genus: Orcaella
      - Irrawaddy dolphin, Orcaella brevirostris VU
    - Genus: Orcinus
      - Killer whale, Orcinus orca DD
    - Genus: Peponocephala
      - Melon-headed whale, Peponocephala electra LC
    - Genus: Physeter
      - Sperm whale, Physeter macrocephalus VU
    - Genus: Pseudorca
      - False killer whale, Pseudorca crassidens DD
    - Genus: Sousa
      - Chinese white dolphin, Sousa chinensis NT
    - Genus: Stenella
      - Pantropical spotted dolphin, Stenella attenuata LC
      - Striped dolphin, Stenella coeruleoalba LC
      - Spinner dolphin, Stenella longgirostris DD
    - Genus: Steno
      - Rough-toothed dolphin, Steno bredanensis LC
    - Genus: Tursiops
      - Common bottlenose dolphin, Tursiops truncatus LC
  - Family: Kogiidae
    - Genus: Kogia
      - Pygmy sperm whale, Kogia breviceps DD
      - Dwarf sperm whale, Kogia sima DD
  - Family: Ziphidae
    - Genus: Mesoplodon
      - Strap-toothed whale, Mesoplodon layardii DD
    - Genus: Ziphius
      - Cuvier's beaked whale, Ziphius cavirostris LC

== Order Artiodactyla ==
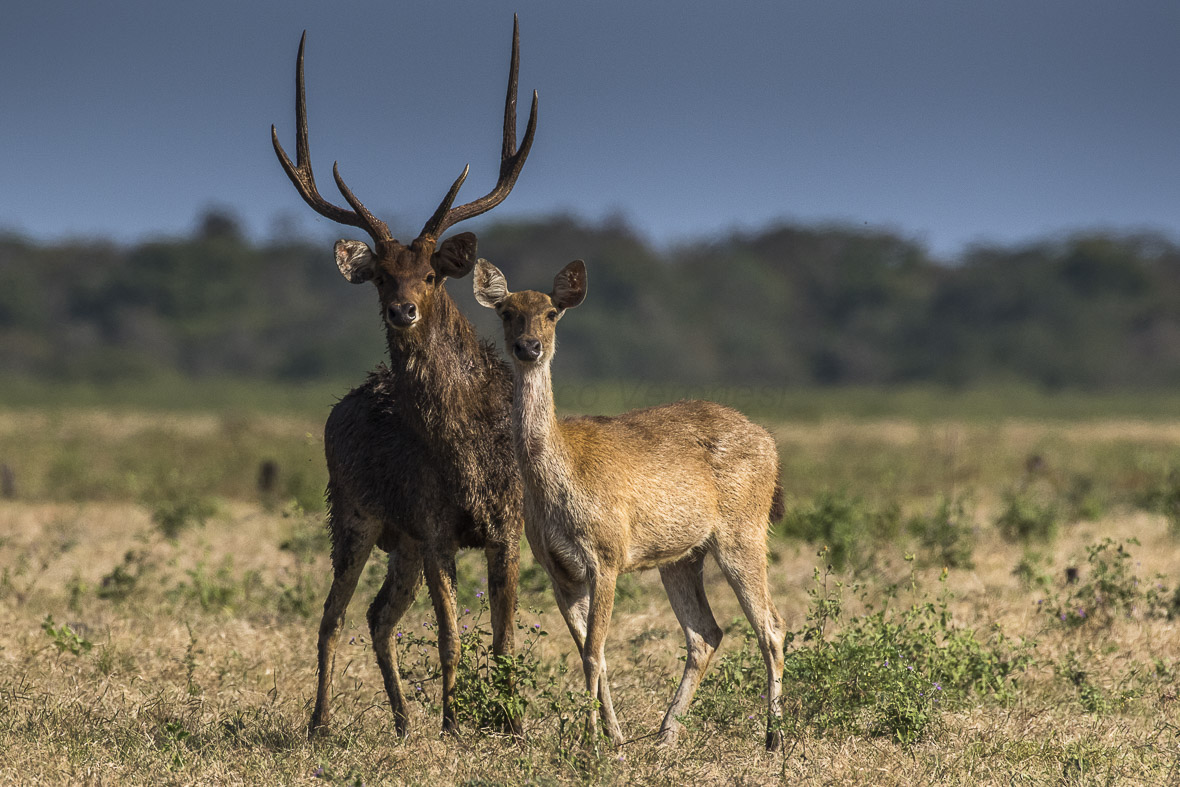
Javan rusa

- Family: Cervidae
  - Genus: Rusa
    - Javan rusa, Rusa timorensis VU

== See also ==
- List of chordate orders
- Lists of mammals by region
