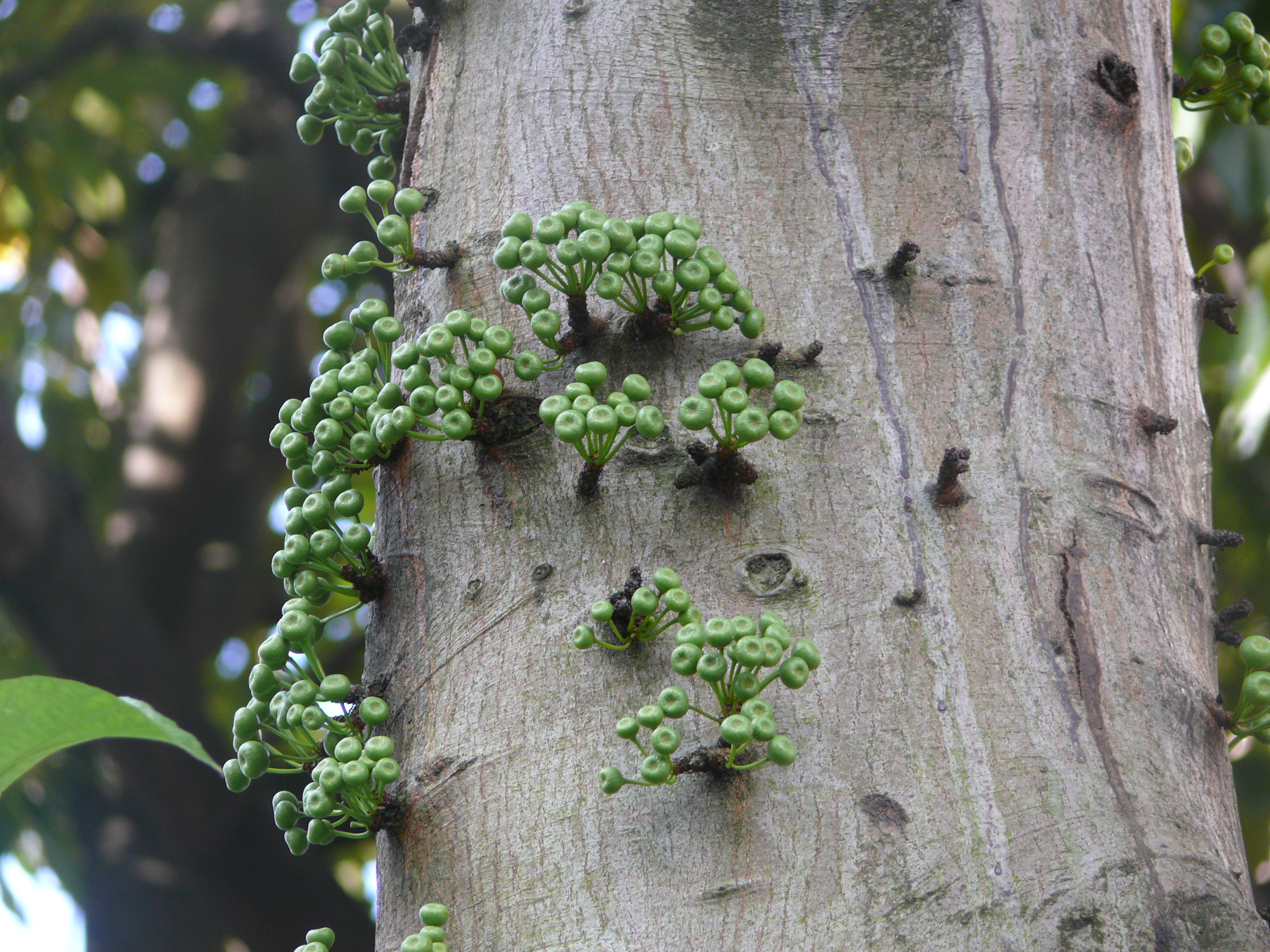

Conservation status
- Least Concern (IUCN 3.1)

Scientific classification
- Kingdom: Plantae
- Clade: Tracheophytes
- Clade: Angiosperms
- Clade: Eudicots
- Clade: Rosids
- Order: Rosales
- Family: Moraceae
- Genus: Ficus
- Subgenus: F. subg. Sycomorus
- Species: F. variegata

Binomial name
- Ficus variegata Blume (1825)

Synonyms
- List: Ficus agusanensis Elmer; Ficus amboinensis Kostel.; Ficus cerifera Blume; Ficus ceriflua Jungh., nom. illeg.; Ficus chlorocarpa Benth.; Ficus compressitora Elmer; Ficus cordifolia Blume; Ficus domestica Zipp. ex Miq.; Ficus ehretioides F.Muell. ex Benth.; Ficus garciae Elmer; Ficus glochidiifolia Hayata; Ficus gummiflua Miq., nom. illeg.; Ficus ilangoides Elmer; Ficus integrifolia Elmer; Ficus konishii Hayata; Ficus laevigata Blanco; Ficus latsonii Elmer; Ficus paucinervia Merr.; Ficus subopaca Miq.; Ficus subracemosa Blume; Ficus sum Gagnep.; Ficus sycomoroides Miq.; Ficus tenimbrensis S.Moore; Ficus variegata var. chlorocarpa King; Ficus variegata var. garciae (Elmer) Corner; Ficus variegata var. ilangoides (Elmer) Corner; Ficus variegata var. kondang Valeton; Ficus variegata var. leles Valeton; Ficus variegata f. paucinervia (Merr.) Sata; Ficus variegata var. pilosior Miq.; Ficus variegata f. rotundata Sata; Ficus variegata var. sycomoroides (Miq.) Corner; Ficus viridicarpa Corner; Sycomorus gummiflua Miq.; Urostigma cordifolium (Blume) Gasp.; Urostigma javanicum Miq.

= Ficus variegata (plant) =

Species of fig tree

Ficus variegata is a well distributed species of tropical fig tree. It occurs in many parts of Asia, islands of the Pacific and as far south east as Australia. There is a large variety of local common names including common red stem fig, green fruited fig and variegated fig. A non strangling fig which may reach 30 metres in height. The tree is evergreen when young but becomes briefly deciduous as it grows older. In Australia the fruit are eaten by cassowaries and double-eyed fig parrots.

Ficus variegata is dioecious, with male and female flowers produced on separate individuals.

== Taxonomy ==
Ficus variegata has been described by Carl Ludwig Blume in 1825. In 1965, E. J. H. Corner updated the species by putting some other Ficus in synonymy with F. variegata varieties. Five were listed: F. variegata var. variegata distributed on all the species range, F. variegata var. chlorocarpa from South China, Hainan Island and Thailand, F. variegata var. garciae described as inhabitant of the Pacific Islands (Ryukyu islands, Taiwan and Philippines), F. variegata var. ilangoides in Luzon and northern Borneo, and F. variegata var. sycomoroides in the Philippines and Borneo. Recently, all the varieties have been synonymized under Ficus variegata. Ficus variegata belongs to the subgenus Sycomorus section Sycomorus subsection Neomorphe.

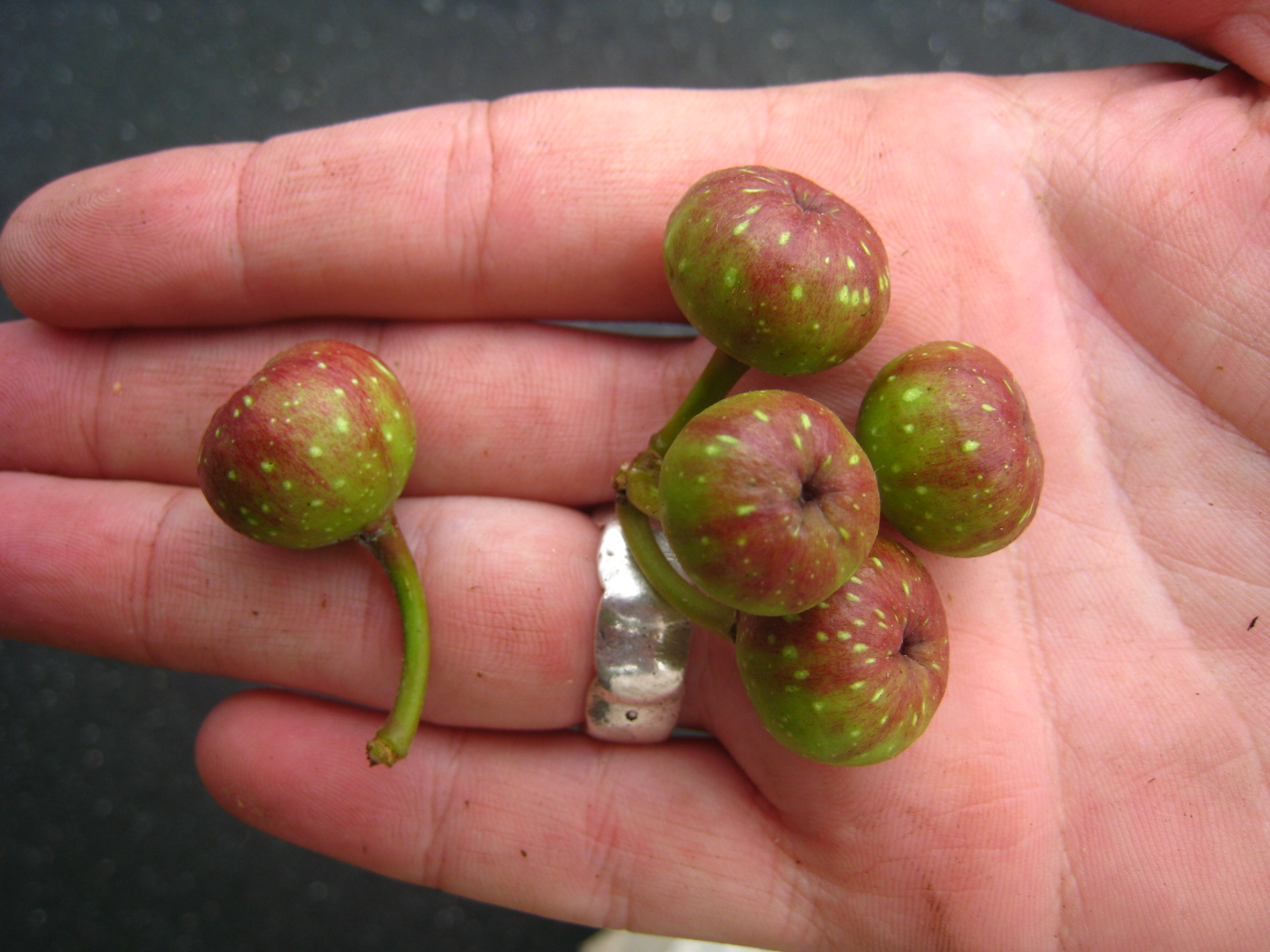
Ficus variegata young figs in Kenting, South Taiwan.

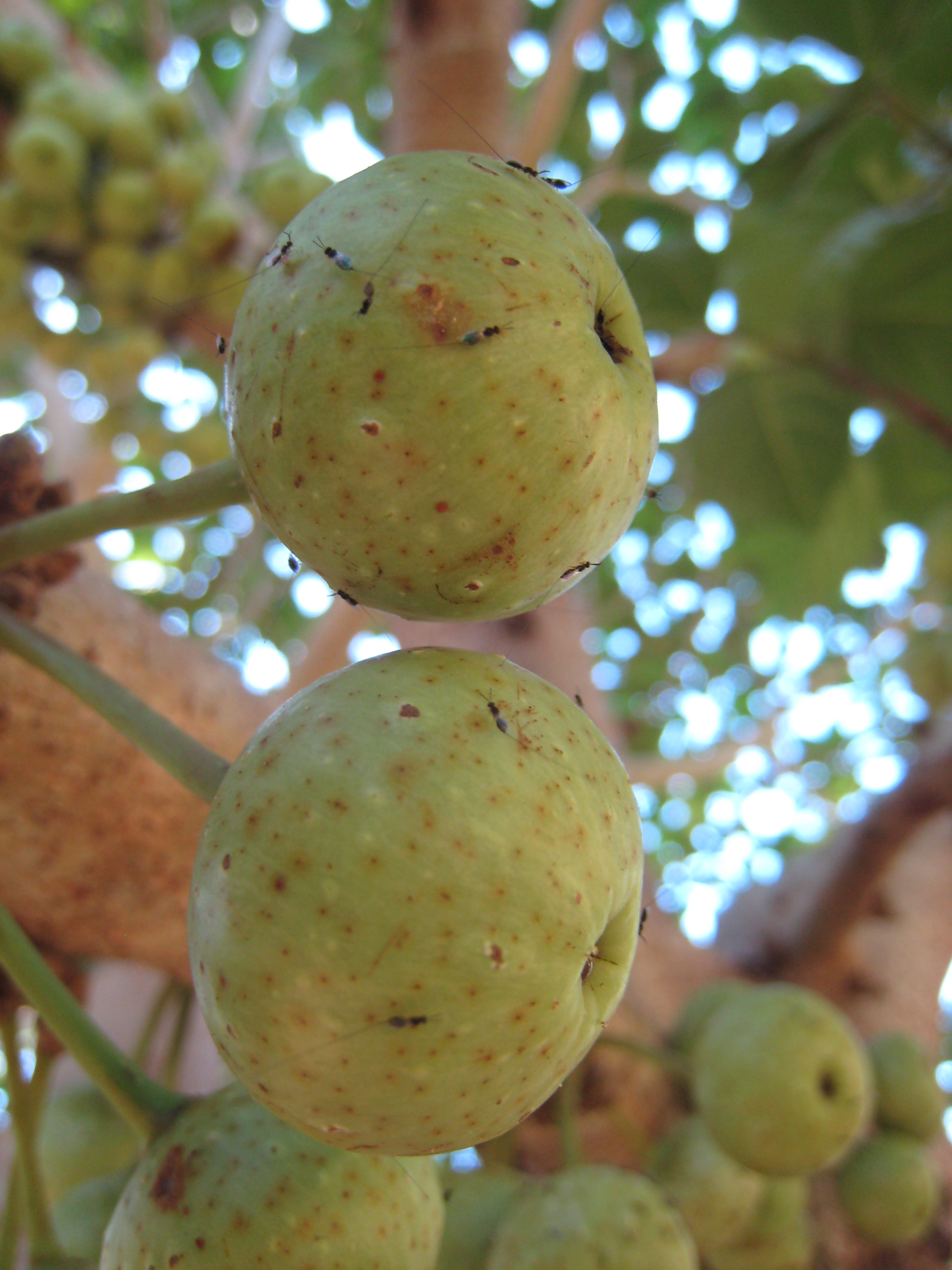
Ficus variegata pollinated figs and parasitic wasps (Sycorictinae) in Kenting, South Taiwan.

== Ecology ==
Ficus variegata is pollinated by fig wasps from the genus Ceratosolen as are all the fig species from the subgenus Sycomorus. The figs of Ficus variegata have been reported to be eaten by 41 animal species (5 birds, 15 bats, 7 monkeys, 7 marsupials):

- Southern cassowary
- Blyth's hornbill
- Yellow-crested cockatoo
- Double-eyed fig parrot
- Japanese white-eye
- Common echymipera
- Long-nosed echymipera
- Raffray's bandicoot
- Ground cuscus
- Northern common cuscus
- Stein's cuscus
- Common spotted cuscus
- Lesser short-nosed fruit bat
- Horsfield's fruit bat
- Greater short-nosed fruit bat
- Indonesian short-nosed fruit bat
- New Guinea naked-backed fruit bat
- Lesser naked-backed fruit bat
- Long-tongued fruit bat
- Broad-striped tube-nosed fruit bat
- Common tube-nosed fruit bat
- Eastern tube-nosed bat
- Lesser tube-nosed fruit bat
- Greater musky fruit bat
- Great flying fox
- Geoffroy's rousette
- Common blossom bat
- Celebes crested macaque
- Javan surili
- Red-shanked douc
- Lar gibbon
- Silvery gibbon
- Agile gibbon
- Bornean orangutan
- Black rat
