= Steadfast tube-nosed fruit bat =

Conservation status
- Least Concern (IUCN 3.1)

Scientific classification
- Kingdom: Animalia
- Phylum: Chordata
- Class: Mammalia
- Order: Chiroptera
- Family: Pteropodidae
- Genus: Paranyctimene
- Species: P. tenax

Binomial name
- Paranyctimene tenax Bergmans, 2001
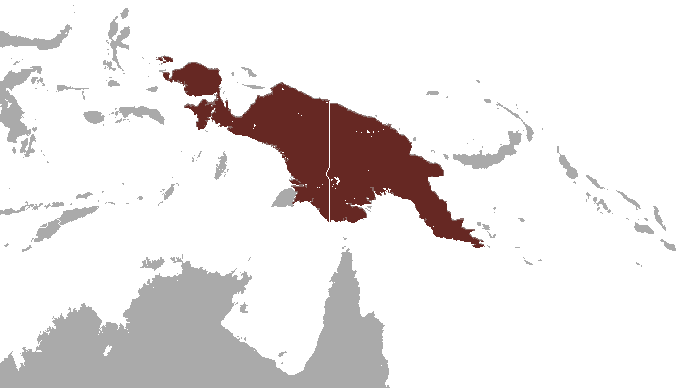
- Range

Species of bat

The steadfast tube-nosed fruit bat (Paranyctimene tenax) is a species of megabat in the family Pteropodidae found in West Papua, Indonesia, and Papua New Guinea.

The species was first proposed as a subgeneric arrangement of Nyctimene, published as Nyctimene (Paranyctimene) tenax. The epithet tenax, derived from the Latin for 'steadfast', was intended to describe the conservation work of Peter Nijhoff, whose retirement was announced when the new species was discovered. The subspecific epithet marculus, derived from Latin, translates as 'little hammer' and the diminutive form of Marc Argeloo's name, a dedication to his collections of bats for the Amsterdam Zoological Museum. Two subspecies were recognised by Mammal Species of the World (2005):

- Paranyctimene

- Paranyctimene raptor (Lesser tube-nosed fruit bat), the type, first proposed in 1942.
- Paranyctimene tenax (Steadfast tube-nosed fruit bat) Bergmans, 2001

The species is larger than Paranyctimene raptor, with recorded forearm measurements of 51.0 to 54.9 millimetres, and the greatest length of the skull in a range of 25.2–27.2 mm for both subspecies.
