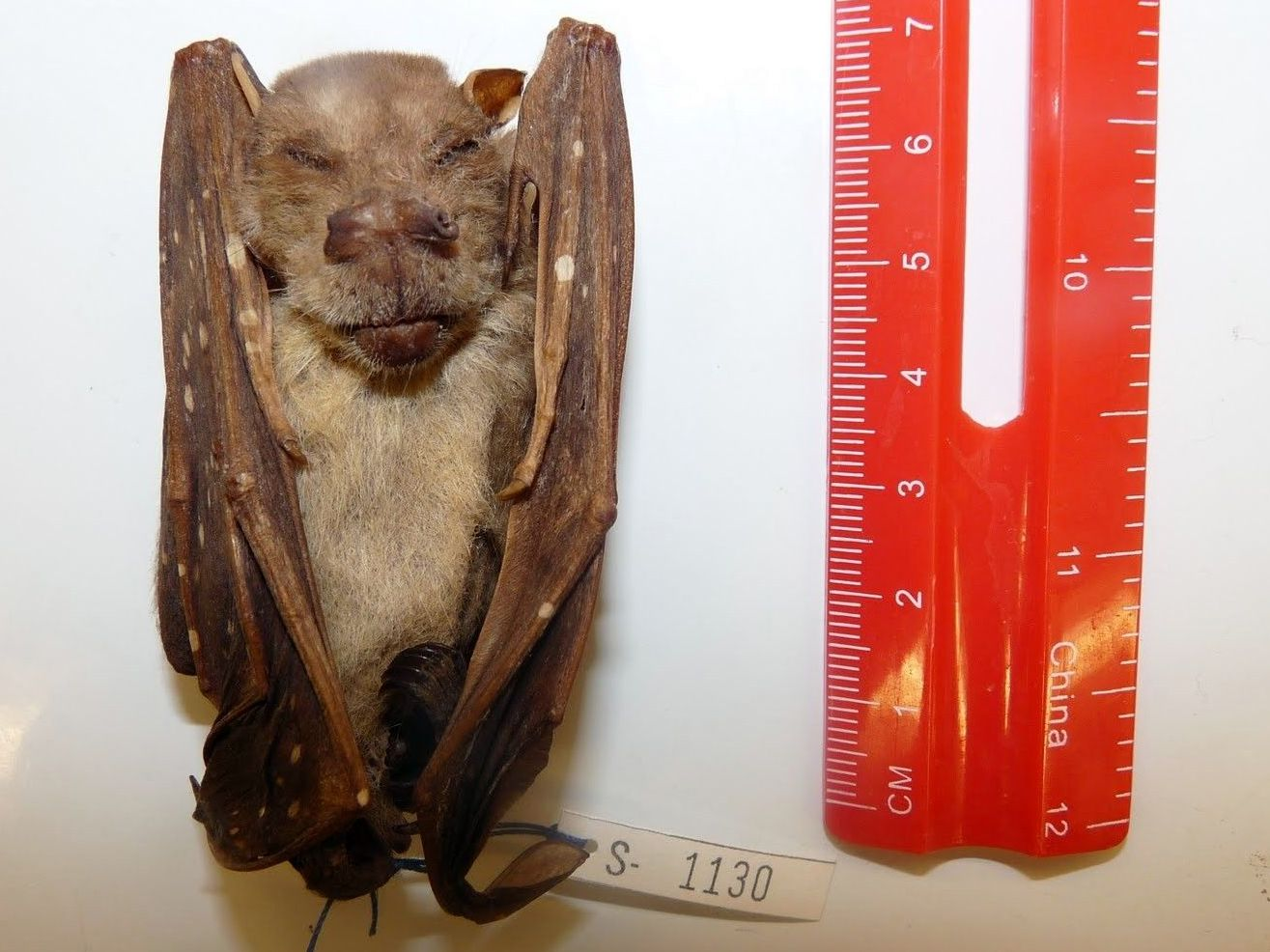
- Paranyctimene raptor

Scientific classification
- Kingdom: Animalia
- Phylum: Chordata
- Class: Mammalia
- Order: Chiroptera
- Family: Pteropodidae
- Subfamily: Nyctimeninae
- Genus: Paranyctimene; Tate, 1942

Type species
- Paranyctimene raptor Tate, 1942

Species
- See Text

= Paranyctimene =

Genus of bats

Paranyctimene is a genus of bats in the family Pteropodidae. They are distributed in Indonesia

== Taxonomy ==
The genus was proposed by George Henry Hamilton Tate in American Museum Novitates (1942), describing specimens obtained on the Archbold 1936-37 expedition to New Guinea. Resembling the genus Nyctimene, the tube-nosed bats, the taxon was reduced to a subgenus of that group in 2001. However, the Mammal Species of the World demurred from this arrangement, pending analysis of the phylogeny of both groups, instead recognising the following taxa:

- Paranyctimene

- Paranyctimene raptor (Lesser tube-nosed fruit bat), the type, first proposed in 1942
- Paranyctimene tenax (Steadfast tube-nosed fruit bat) Bergmans, 2001

- Paranyctimene tenax tenax
- Paranyctimene tenax marculus Bergmans, 2001
