= Pallas's =

Pallas's could refer to any of the following animals, named after the biologist Peter Pallas:

== Birds ==
- Pallas's cormorant
- Pallas's fish-eagle
- Pallas's gull
- Pallas's grasshopper warbler
- Pallas's leaf warbler
- Pallas's reed bunting
- Pallas's rosefinch
- Pallas's sandgrouse

== Mammals ==
- Pallas's long-tongued bat
- Pallas's tube-nosed fruit bat
- Pallas's cat
- Pallas's squirrel
- Pallas's pika
