= Keast's tube-nosed fruit bat =

Conservation status
- Near Threatened (IUCN 3.1)

Scientific classification
- Kingdom: Animalia
- Phylum: Chordata
- Class: Mammalia
- Order: Chiroptera
- Family: Pteropodidae
- Genus: Nyctimene
- Species: N. keasti

Binomial name
- Nyctimene keasti Kitchener, Packer, and Maryanto, 1993.
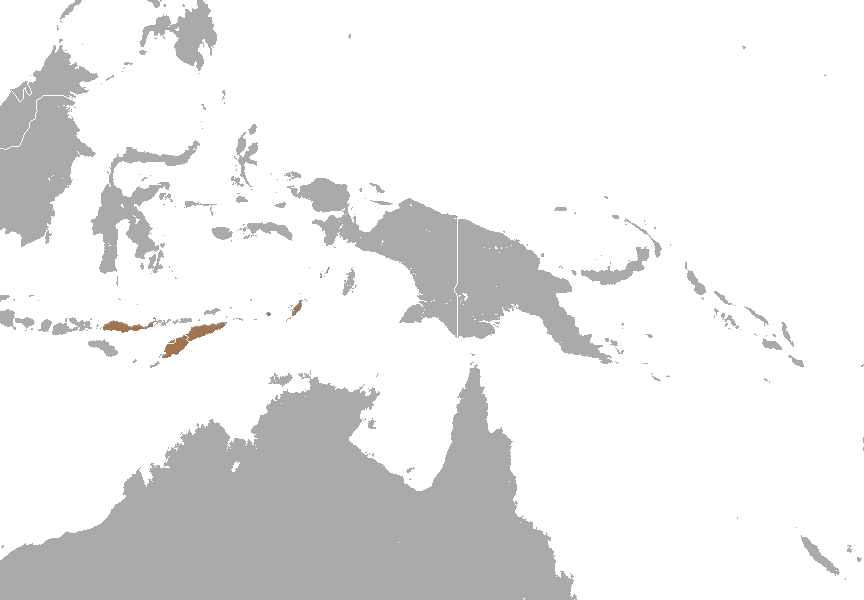
- Keast's tube-nosed fruit bat range

Species of bat

Keast's tube-nosed fruit bat (Nyctimene keasti) is a species of megabat in the family Pteropodidae found in Babar, Tanimbar, and the Kai Islands. It was named after Colin Keast.

== Description ==
Keast's tube-nosed fruit bat is a species in the genus Nyctimene, which includes bats that have prominent nostrils splaying out in opposite directions. The pelage of the species is gender dimorphic, males are notably darker and fawn-coloured, females are predominantly buff-yellow lightened by a drab colour at the base of the hair.

== Taxonomy ==
The taxon was first described as a subspecies of Nyctimene albiventer in 1993. A review of the systematics two years later elevated the status of the group to species and distinguished island populations previously described as Nyctimene cephalotes. The holotype was collected in 1992 in a mist net, close to sea level, at the edge of forest near a lake, on an island in the Maluku (province). The epithet of the species refers to an honorary assistant at the Western Australian Museum, Colin Keast, who assisted in the preparation of the specimen's skulls.
