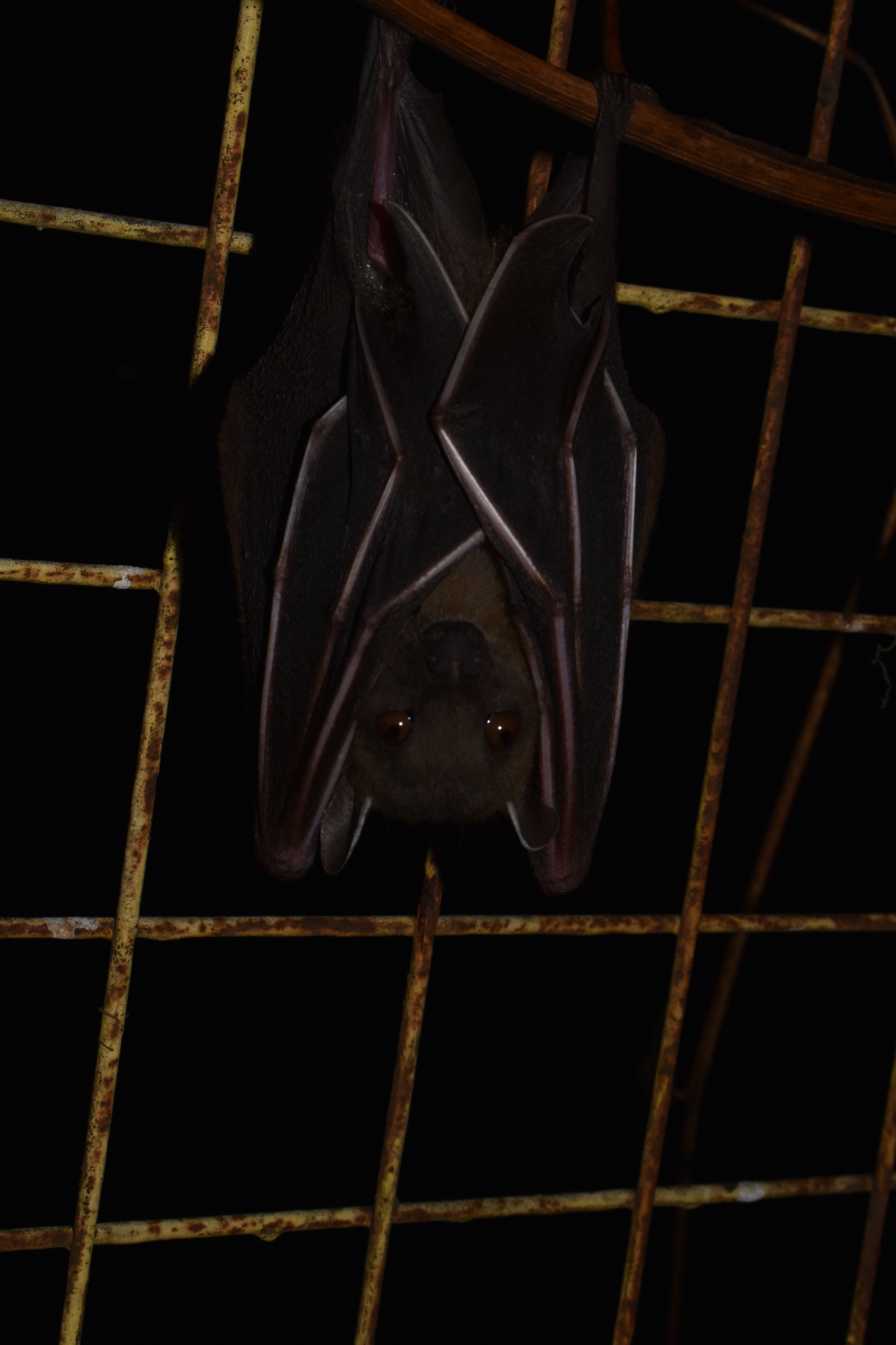

Conservation status
- Least Concern (IUCN 3.1)

Scientific classification
- Kingdom: Animalia
- Phylum: Chordata
- Class: Mammalia
- Order: Chiroptera
- Family: Pteropodidae
- Genus: Cynopterus
- Species: C. luzoniensis

Binomial name
- Cynopterus luzoniensis (Peters, 1861)
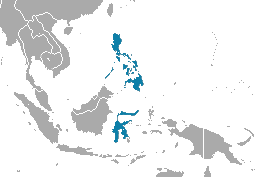
- Peters's Fruit Bat range

= Peters's fruit bat =

Peters's Fruit Bat

Species of bat

Peters's fruit bat (Cynopterus luzoniensis) is a species of megabat within the family Pteropodidae. It is found in Sulawesi, Philippines, and adjacent small islands.
