= Philippine tube-nosed fruit bat =

Conservation status
- Endangered (IUCN 3.1)

Scientific classification
- Kingdom: Animalia
- Phylum: Chordata
- Class: Mammalia
- Order: Chiroptera
- Family: Pteropodidae
- Genus: Nyctimene
- Species: N. rabori

Binomial name
- Nyctimene rabori Heaney & Peterson, 1984
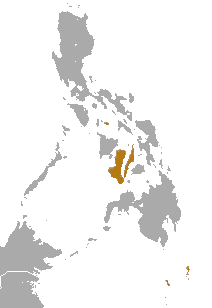
- Philippine tube-nosed fruit bat range

Species of bat

The Philippine tube-nosed fruit bat (Nyctimene rabori) locally known in Tagalog as Bayakan is a species of bat in the family Pteropodidae. It is endemic to the Philippines and known from the islands of Cebu, Negros and Sibuyan. It occurs in and near primary and secondary subtropical or tropical dry forests. It is often found near water. The species is named for Dioscoro S. Rabor who, with several others, first collected the species.

Other common names of the species include Visayan tube-nosed fruit bat and Rabor's tube-nosed fruit bat.

== Conservation ==
Nyctimene rabori is currently classified as endangered by the International Union for Conservation of Nature (IUCN). It is threatened by habitat loss due to deforestation.

== See also ==
- Giant golden-crowned flying fox
- Philippine naked-backed fruit bat
- IUCN Red List endangered species (Animalia)
