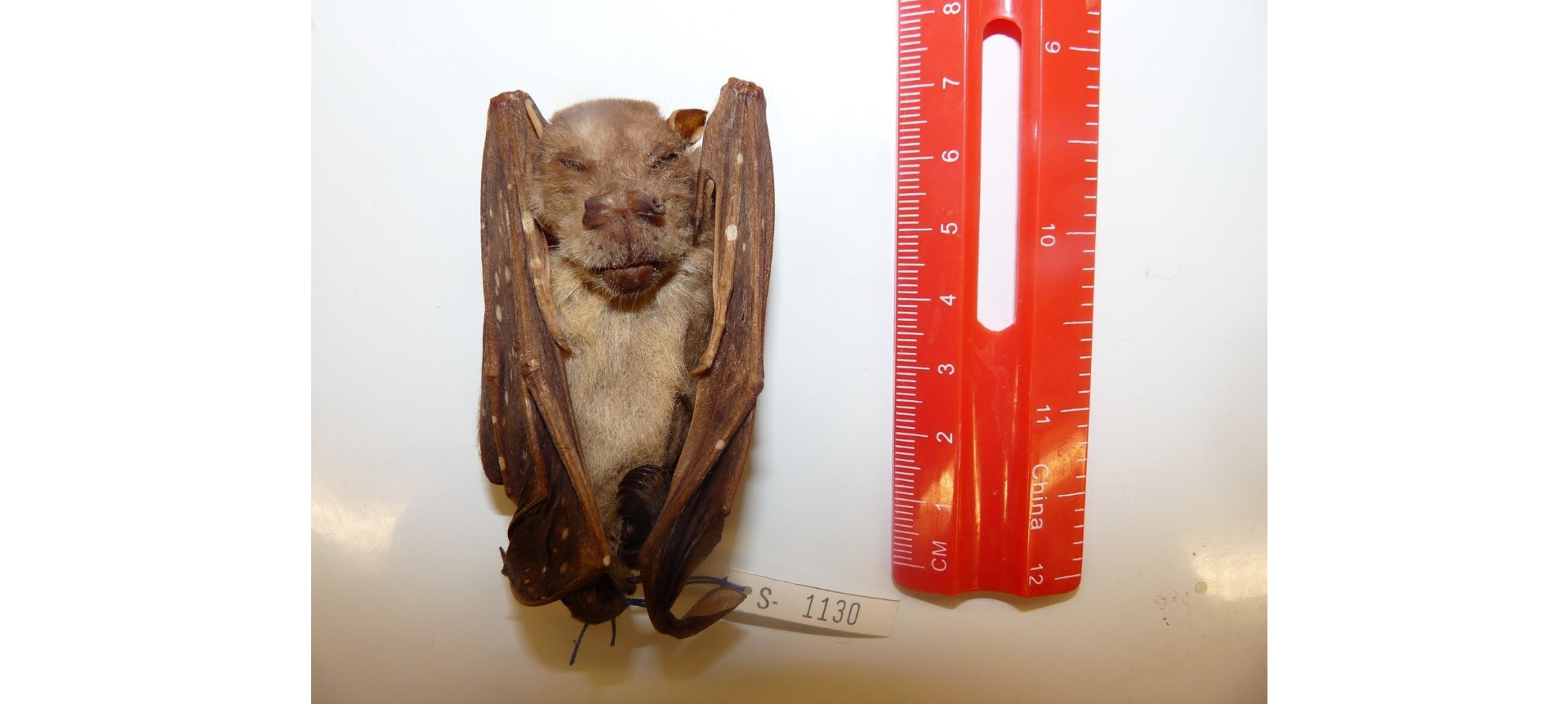

Conservation status
- Least Concern (IUCN 3.1)

Scientific classification
- Kingdom: Animalia
- Phylum: Chordata
- Class: Mammalia
- Infraclass: Placentalia
- Order: Chiroptera
- Family: Pteropodidae
- Genus: Paranyctimene
- Species: P. raptor

Binomial name
- Paranyctimene raptor Tate, 1942
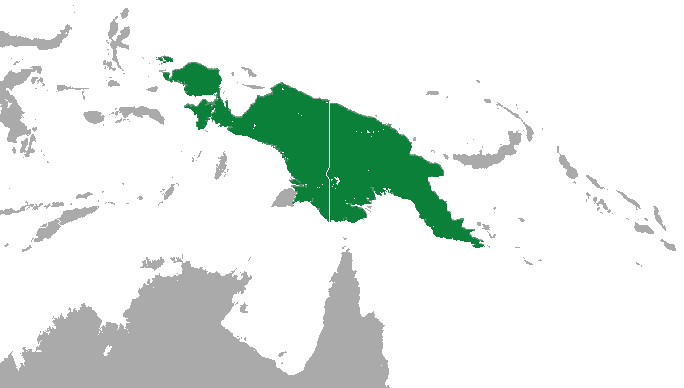
- Lesser tube-nosed fruit bat range

= Lesser tube-nosed fruit bat =

Species of bat

The lesser tube-nosed fruit bat or unstriped tube-nosed bat (Paranyctimene raptor) is a species of megabat in the family Pteropodidae found in West Papua, Indonesia and Papua New Guinea.

== Taxonomy ==
First described by George H. H. Tate in 1942, the species was re-diagnosed when a sympatric species was described in 2001. The first description did not adequately exclude the new species, and specimens previously recorded as Paranyctimene raptor may have been misdiagnosed. The 2001 revision re-allocated specimens from the type locality, and did not recognise the taxon Paranyctimene except as a subgenus of Nyctimene.
