= Masalai =

Supernatural spirits in Papua New Guinea

Masalai are a type of supernatural spirit in Papua New Guinea.

Margaret Mead defined them as: "supernatural beings that inhabit specific places, usually distinguished by some special natural feature (a water hole, waterfall, bend in a river, cliff, marsh, etc.), and that exercise limited jurisdiction over their own area; they may manifest themselves as snakes, crocodiles and other creatures, often with bizarre features, such as strange coloring, two heads, etc. Masalai may be associated with descent lines, moieties, hamlets, villages."

According to legend, Masalai may employ trickery to seduce people, causing genital bleeding and death. White people were sometimes mistaken for masalai because their clothes resembled snake skin being shed. There are numerous folk tales about the masalai.
