= Nendo tube-nosed fruit bat =

Conservation status
- Data Deficient (IUCN 3.1)

Scientific classification
- Kingdom: Animalia
- Phylum: Chordata
- Class: Mammalia
- Infraclass: Placentalia
- Order: Chiroptera
- Family: Pteropodidae
- Genus: Nyctimene
- Species: N. sanctacrucis

Binomial name
- Nyctimene sanctacrucis (Troughton, 1931)
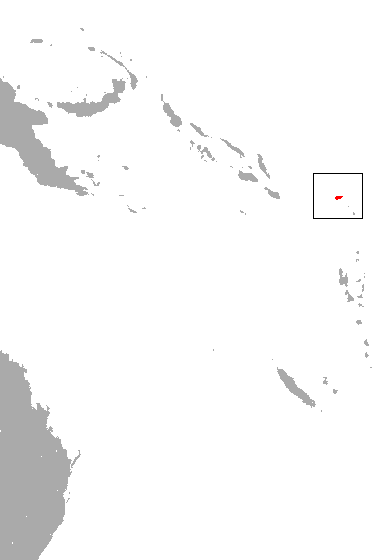
- Nendo tube-nosed fruit bat former range

Extinct species of bat

The Nendo or Santa Cruz tube-nosed fruit bat (Nyctimene sanctacrucis) is a megabat from the Santa Cruz Group of the Solomon Islands, near the eastern limit of the distribution of tube-nosed fruit bats. It has tube-like nostrils and a wingspan of about 40 centimetres (16 in).

The species is known from a single female specimen collected in the late 19th century and donated to the Australian Museum, Sydney, in 1892. It apparently was last seen on the island of Nendo in 1907. It has previously been treated as extinct but is currently classified as data deficient by the IUCN due to continuing concerns about the species' taxonomic validity.
