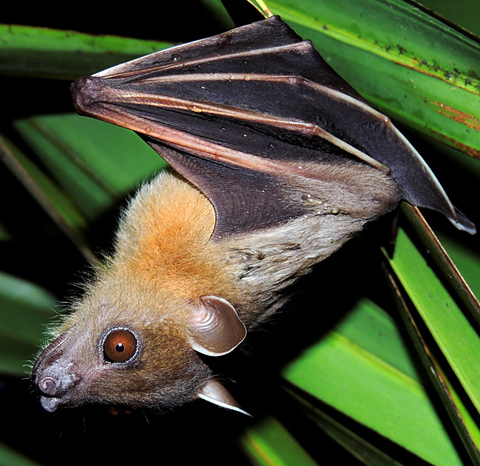
- Hanging over foliage palm in Mangaon, Maharashtra

Conservation status
- Least Concern (IUCN 3.1)

Scientific classification
- Kingdom: Animalia
- Phylum: Chordata
- Class: Mammalia
- Order: Chiroptera
- Family: Pteropodidae
- Genus: Cynopterus
- Species: C. sphinx

Binomial name
- Cynopterus sphinx (Vahl, 1797)
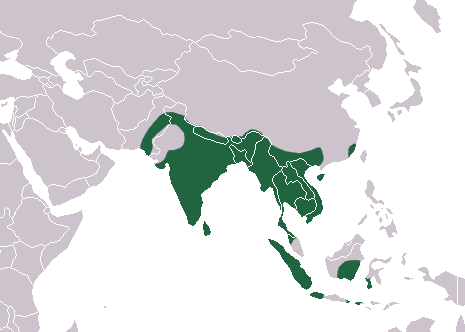
- Greater short-nosed fruit bat range

= Greater short-nosed fruit bat =

Species of bat

The greater short-nosed fruit bat (Cynopterus sphinx), or short-nosed Indian fruit bat, is a species of megabat in the family Pteropodidae found in South and Southeast Asia.

== Description ==
These bats have a relatively long snout. Their upper parts are brown to grey-brown with paler under parts. The fur is very fine and silky. The ears and wing bones of C. sphinx are edged in white. Lower cheek teeth rounded without accessory cusps. The wingspan of the adult is about 48 cm (19 in). Juveniles are lighter than adults. Average forearm length is 70.2 mm (2.76 in), with a range of 64–79 mm (2.5–3.1 in).

== Habitat ==
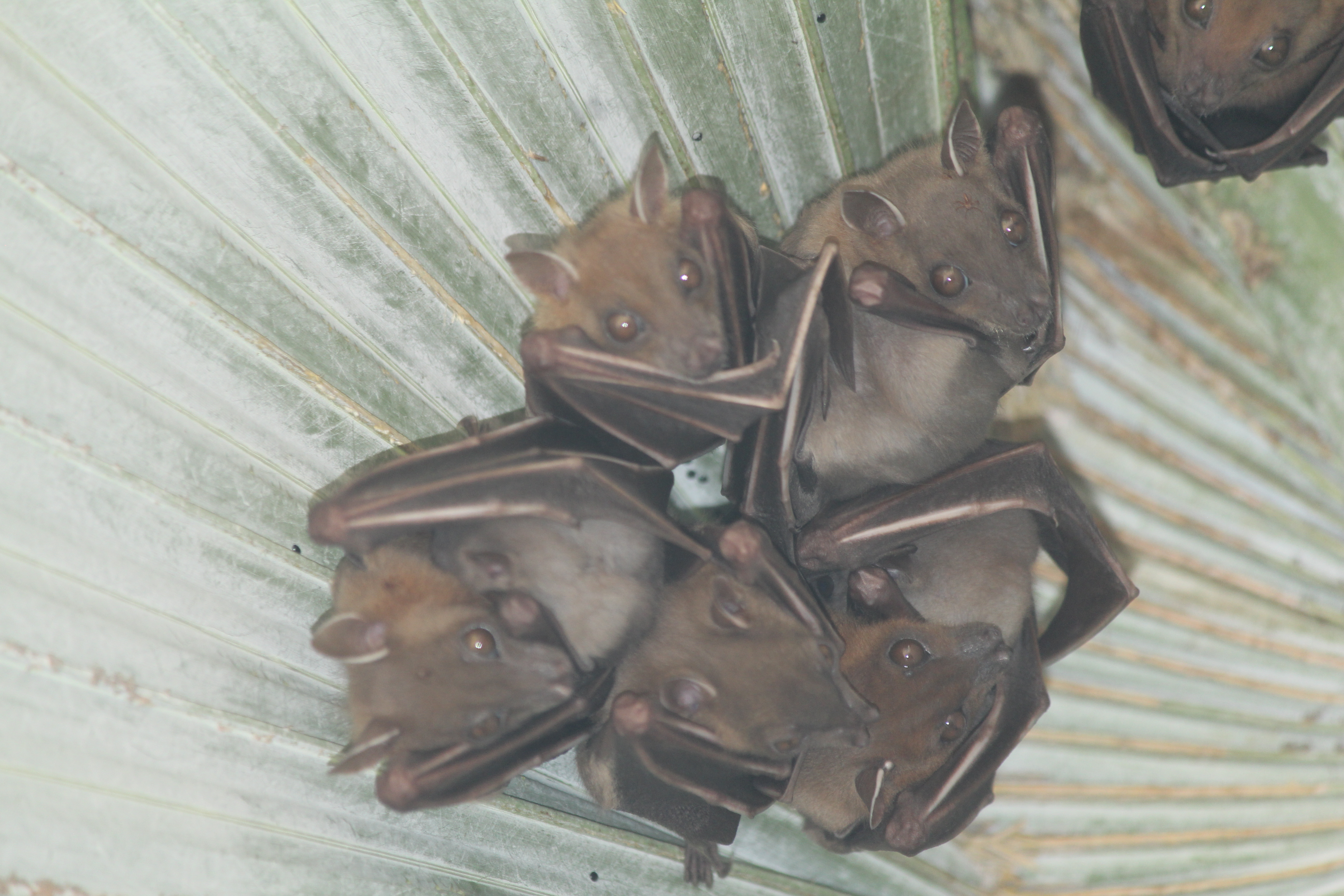
C. sphinx bats perching in a palm tree.

The greater short-nosed fruit bat is found from Pakistan to Vietnam. It is common in tropical forests and areas where fruit crops are cultivated. They can also be found in grasslands and mangrove forests. They typically nest high in palm trees. The bats chew the fronds of the palms to construct fairly simple tents. These bats are also known to construct tents by closely interweaving the leaves and twigs of creeping vines which cover buildings, but such nests are constructed only when palms are not available.

== Behaviour and breeding ==
The greater short-nosed fruit bat is gregarious, and typically roosts in same-sex groups of eight to nine individuals. The sexes remain separate until the mating season, when group size increases. They are polygynous and 6–10 males and 10–15 females usually share palm-frond tents during the breeding season. They are known to perform fellatio, which enhances copulation time in the species. Copulation by males is dorsoventral and the females lick the shaft or the base of the male's penis, but not the glans which has already penetrated the vagina. While the females do this, the penis is not withdrawn and research has shown a positive relationship between length of the time that the penis is licked and the duration of copulation. Postcopulation genital grooming has also been observed. Males stay with females for some time after mating, but later return to same-sex groups.

Female bats perform fellatio to increase copulation time.

The adult sex ratio is very female biased. Researchers attribute this to the relatively rapid maturation of females compared to males. In Central India, C. sphinx breeds twice per year. Females produce a single young at a time. Each half of the bicornate uterus functions during alternate breeding cycles. The first pregnancy cycle occurs from October through February/March. Mating occurs immediately post partum, and a second offspring is born in July. Gestation period is about 3–5 months. In 72% of bats, the first pregnancy occurs in the right horn of the uterus. The corpus luteum in the right ovary persists for some time after the pregnancy and prevents ovulation from occurring in the right ovary during the second breeding cycle. This creates the pattern of alternate functioning of the two horns of the uterus. However, the corpus luteum in the left ovary does not persist until the beginning of the next breeding cycle. As yet, no reason has been found for the dominance of the right horn during the first breeding cycle. Newborn bats weigh about 13.5 g (0.48 oz) and have a wingspan of 24 cm (9.4 in). By the time of weaning at 4 weeks of age, young bats weigh 25 g (0.88 oz) and have wings spanning 36 cm (14 in). Female short-nosed fruit bats reach sexual maturity at 5–6 months of age, but males are not capable of breeding until they are a year old.

These bats are frugivorous, and locate their preferred food items by scent. They have been described as voracious feeders, eating more than their body weight in food in one sitting. Some preferred fruits include ripe guava, banana, chikoo, dates, and lychees.

Short-nosed fruit bats inflict serious damage on many fruit crops, and are considered pests. In addition, these bats are possible vectors for Japanese encephalitis, which is serious disease in humans. These bats are important dispersers of date palm seeds, and pollinate many night blooming flowers.

They are also known to construct shelter tents by severing leaves and stems from certain creepers and mast trees like Polyalthia longifolia.

Frugivory, nectarivory, and folivory are well understood; in addition, geophagy behaviour has also been reported in this species recently, and is suggested to represent an 'adaptive behavioural plasticity' in the foraging behaviour of the greater short-nosed fruit bat. According to Mahandran et al. geophagy have the function of mineral supplementation and/or detoxification.

== Gallery ==
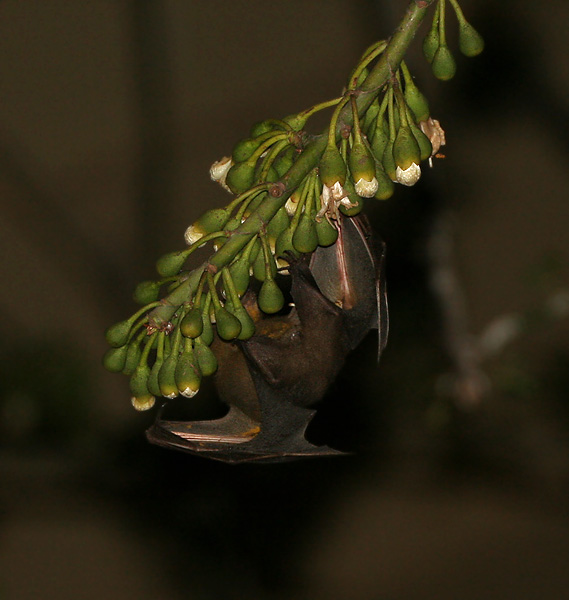
Feeding on kapok (Ceiba pentandra) at night in Kolkata, West Bengal, India

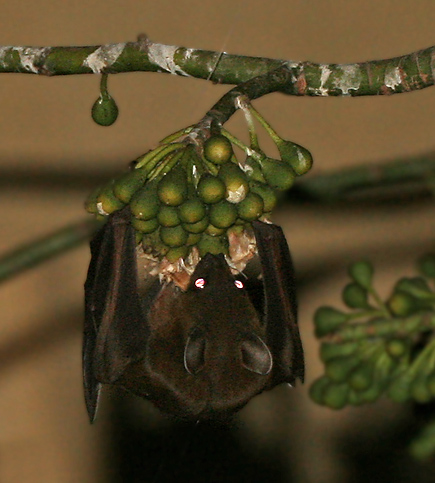
Feeding on kapok at night in Kolkata

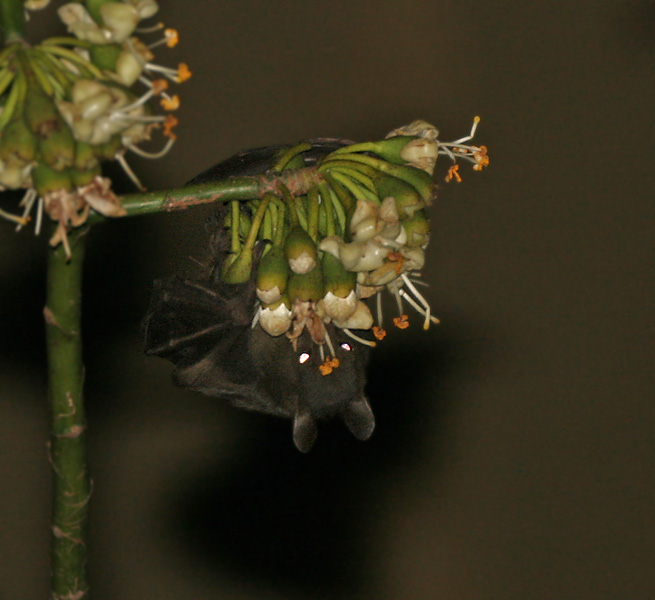
Feeding on kapok at night in Kolkata
