= Umboi tube-nosed fruit bat =

Conservation status
- Least Concern (IUCN 3.1)

Scientific classification
- Kingdom: Animalia
- Phylum: Chordata
- Class: Mammalia
- Order: Chiroptera
- Family: Pteropodidae
- Genus: Nyctimene
- Species: N. vizcaccia

Binomial name
- Nyctimene vizcaccia Thomas, 1914
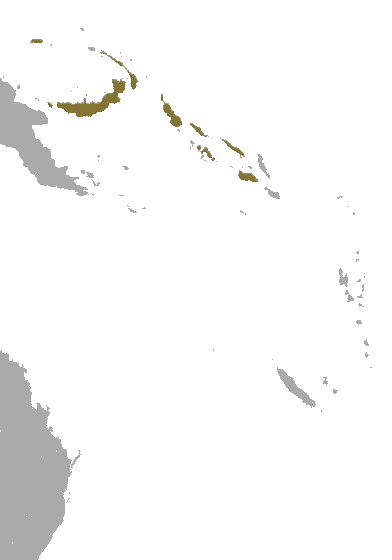
- Umboi tube-nosed fruit bat range

Species of bat

The Umboi tube-nosed fruit bat (Nyctimene vizcaccia) is a species of megabat in the family Pteropodidae. It is found in Papua New Guinea and the Solomon Islands.
