= Dragon tube-nosed fruit bat =

Conservation status
- Data Deficient (IUCN 3.1)

Scientific classification
- Kingdom: Animalia
- Phylum: Chordata
- Class: Mammalia
- Order: Chiroptera
- Family: Pteropodidae
- Genus: Nyctimene
- Species: N. draconilla

Binomial name
- Nyctimene draconilla Thomas, 1922
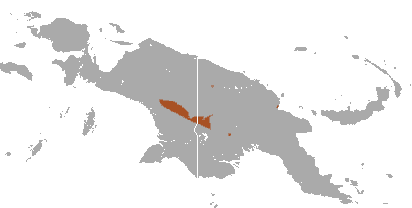
- Dragon tube-nosed fruit bat range

Species of bat

The dragon tube-nosed fruit bat (Nyctimene draconilla) is a species of bat in the family Pteropodidae. It is found on both sides of New Guinea. It is slightly smaller but otherwise similar in appearance to N. albiventer, differing by having more profuse, dark spotting on its wing membranes, and smaller shorter canines. The similarity between the species has been a source of possible misidentifications. The records of this species from Papua New Guinea are associated with freshwater swamps and rivers.

== Taxonomy ==
The dragon tube-nosed fruit bat was described as a new species in 1922 by British zoologist Oldfield Thomas. The holotype had been collected by Gerard Versteeg near the Lorentz River in Papua New Guinea. Thomas noted its small size compared to other Nyctimene species.
