= Malaita tube-nosed fruit bat =

Conservation status
- Least Concern (IUCN 3.1)

Scientific classification
- Kingdom: Animalia
- Phylum: Chordata
- Class: Mammalia
- Order: Chiroptera
- Family: Pteropodidae
- Genus: Nyctimene
- Species: N. malaitensis

Binomial name
- Nyctimene malaitensis Phillips, 1968
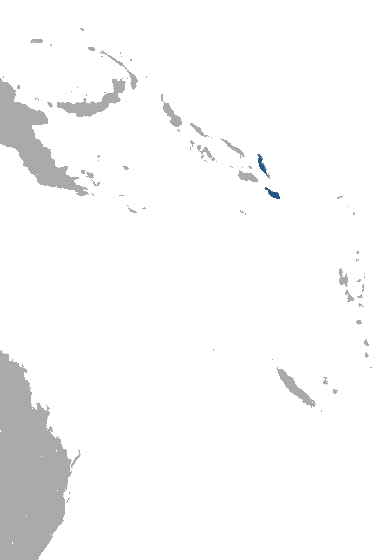
- Malaita tube-nosed fruit bat range

Species of bat

The Malaita tube-nosed fruit bat (Nyctimene malaitensis) is a species of bat in the family Pteropodidae. It is endemic only to the islands of Malaita and Makira (formerly known as San Cristóbal) in the Solomon Islands. The species occurs in primary tropical moist forest.
