= Nusatenggara short-nosed fruit bat =

Conservation status
- Least Concern (IUCN 3.1)

Scientific classification
- Kingdom: Animalia
- Phylum: Chordata
- Class: Mammalia
- Order: Chiroptera
- Family: Pteropodidae
- Genus: Cynopterus
- Species: C. nusatenggara

Binomial name
- Cynopterus nusatenggara Kitchener and Maharadatunkamsi, 1991
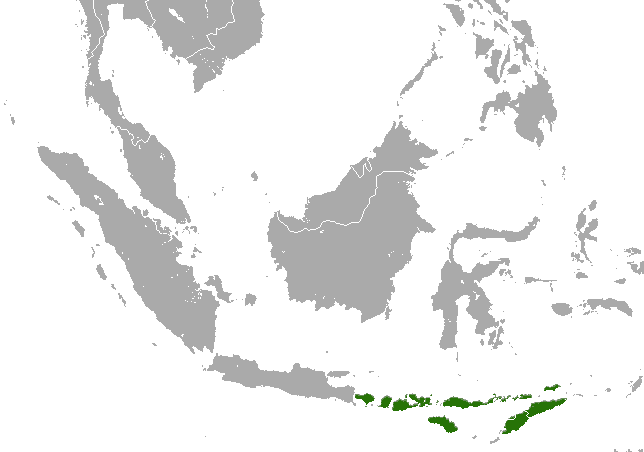
- Range

Species of bat

The Nusatenggara short-nosed fruit bat (Cynopterus nusatenggara) is a species of megabat in the family Pteropodidae. It is found in Indonesia and Timor-Leste.

There are three subspecies recognised:

- C. n. nusatenggara
- C. n. sinagai
- C. n. wetarensis
