= Mountain tube-nosed fruit bat =

Conservation status
- Least Concern (IUCN 3.1)]

Scientific classification
- Kingdom: Animalia
- Phylum: Chordata
- Class: Mammalia
- Order: Chiroptera
- Family: Pteropodidae
- Genus: Nyctimene
- Species: N. certans

Binomial name
- Nyctimene certans Andersen, 1912
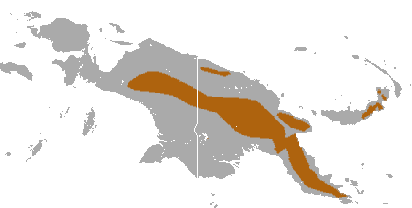
- Range

Species of bat

The mountain tube-nosed fruit bat (Nyctimene certans) is a species of megabat in the family Pteropodidae. It is endemic to New Guinea island and to New Britain Island.
