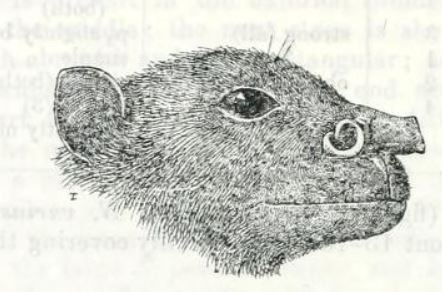

Conservation status
- Least Concern (IUCN 3.1)

Scientific classification
- Kingdom: Animalia
- Phylum: Chordata
- Class: Mammalia
- Order: Chiroptera
- Family: Pteropodidae
- Genus: Nyctimene
- Species: N. major

Binomial name
- Nyctimene major (Dobson, 1877)
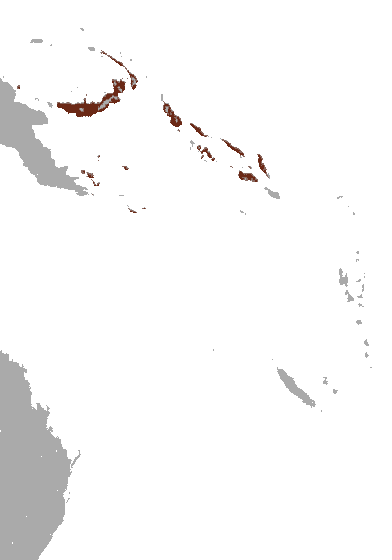
- Island tube-nosed fruit bat range

Synonyms
- Gelasinus major (Dobson, 1877)

= Island tube-nosed fruit bat =

Species of bat

The island tube-nosed fruit bat (Nyctimene major) is a species of bat in the family Pteropodidae. It is found in Papua New Guinea and the Solomon Islands.
