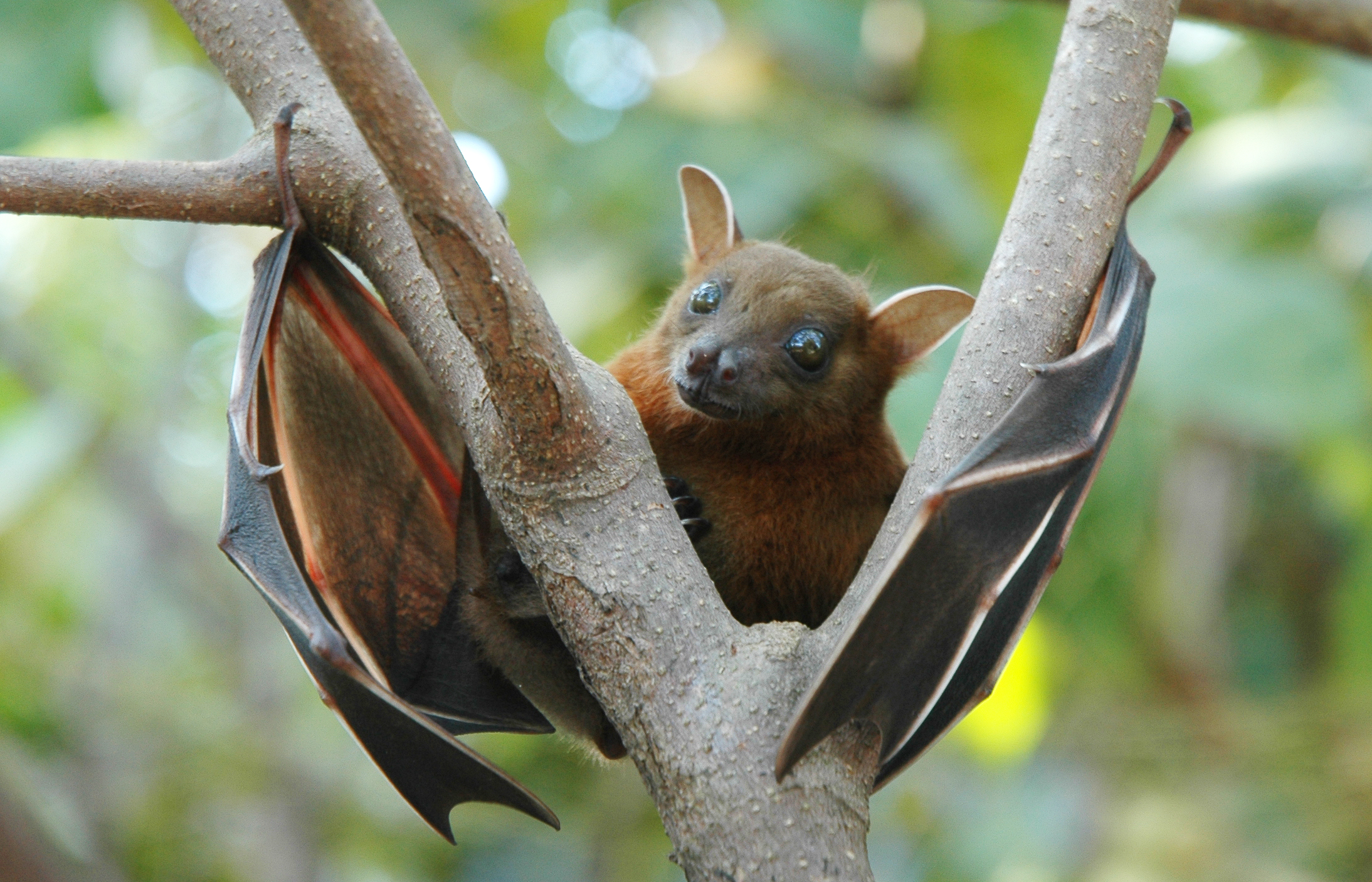
- C. brachyotis on branch
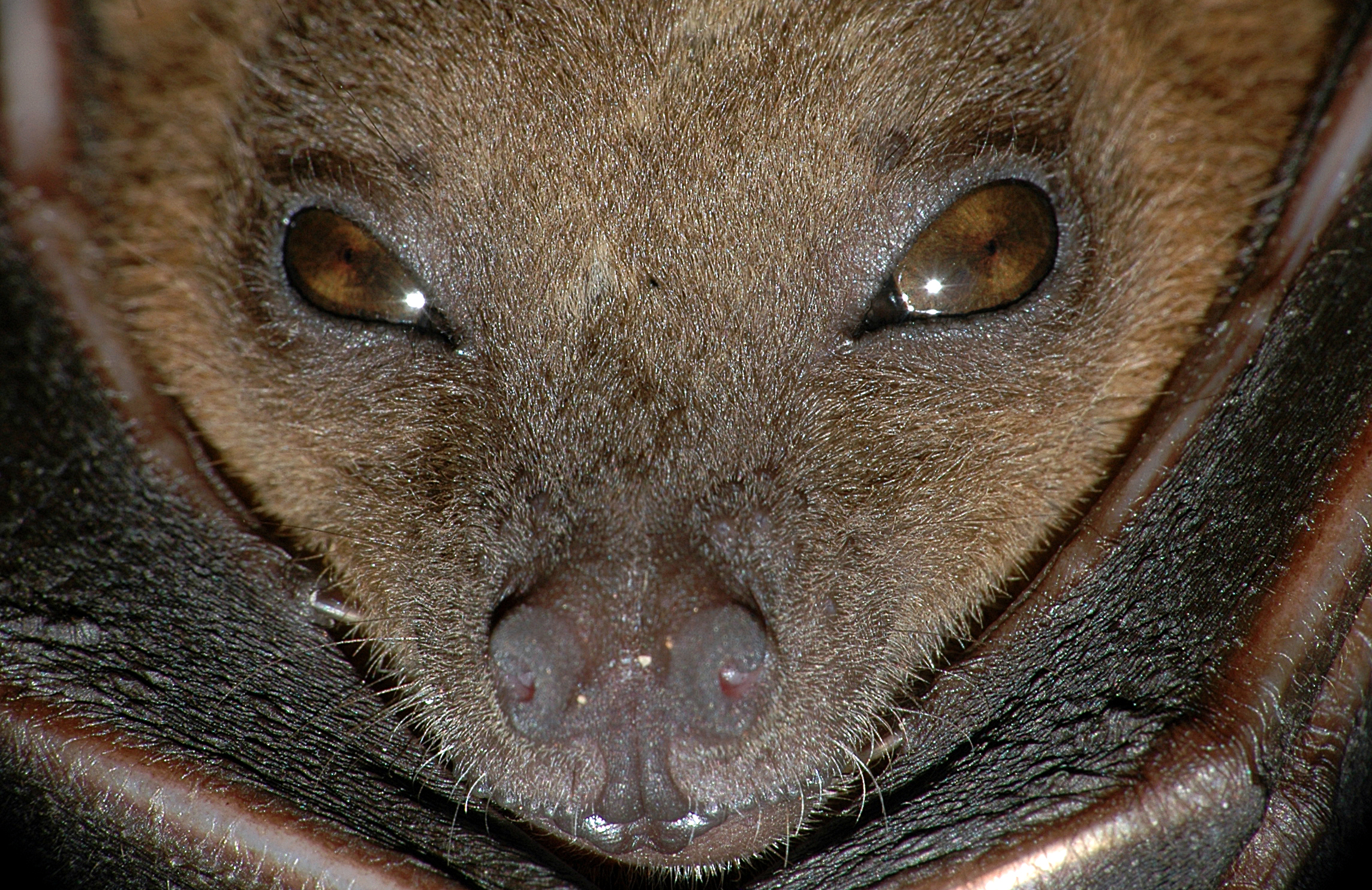
- Close-up of face

Conservation status
- Least Concern (IUCN 3.1)

Scientific classification
- Kingdom: Animalia
- Phylum: Chordata
- Class: Mammalia
- Order: Chiroptera
- Family: Pteropodidae
- Genus: Cynopterus
- Species: C. brachyotis

Binomial name
- Cynopterus brachyotis (Müller, 1838)
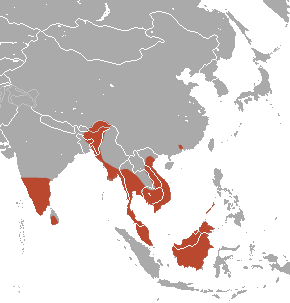
- Lesser short-nosed fruit bat range

= Lesser short-nosed fruit bat =

Species of bat

The lesser short-nosed fruit bat (Cynopterus brachyotis) is a species of megabat within the family Pteropodidae. It is a small bat that lives in South Asia and Southeast Asia. It weighs between 21 and 32 grams (0.74 and 1.13 oz), and measures 70 to 127 millimetres (2.8 to 5.0 in). It occurs in many types of habitat, but most frequently in disturbed forest, including lower montane forest and tropical lowland rain forest, plus gardens, mangroves, and vegetation on beaches.

== Description ==
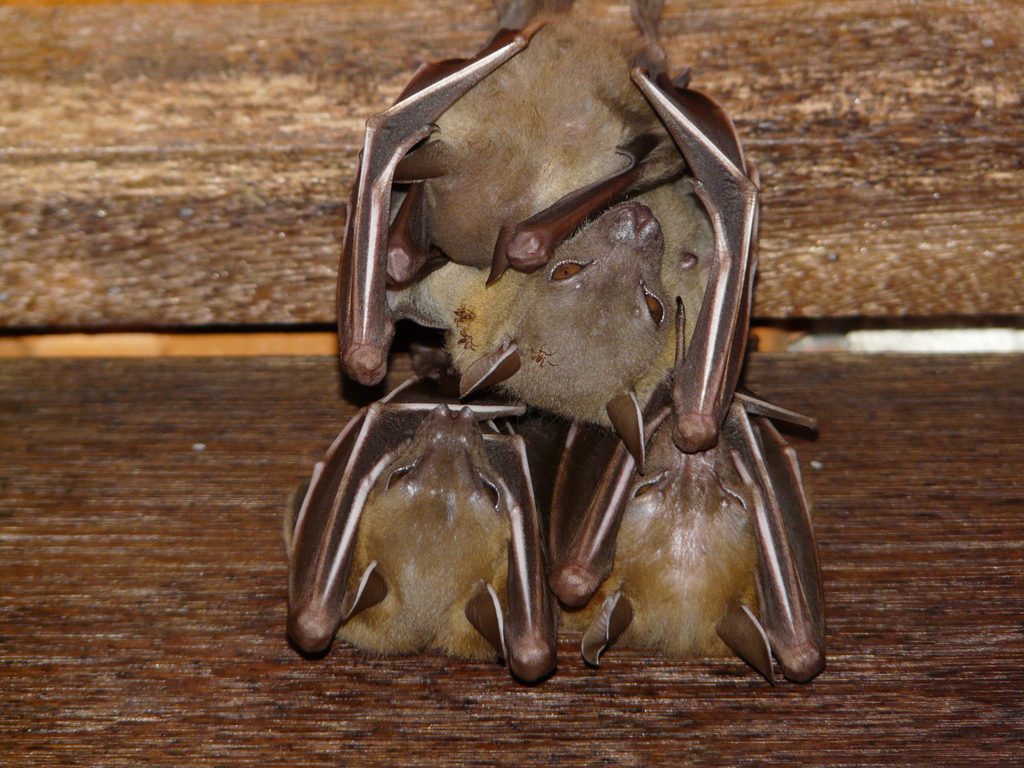
Hanging

Lesser short-nosed fruit bats are generally brown to yellowish brown with a brighter collar. Adult males have dark orange collars whereas adult females have yellowish collars. An indistinct collar is observed in some immature bats. The edges of the ears and the wing bones are usually white. Individuals have two pairs of lower incisors, a fox-like face and large dark eyes. The head and body length is 7–8 cm (2.8–3.1 in), the forearm length is 6–7 cm (2.4–2.8 in), tail length is 0.8–1.0 cm (0.31–0.39 in), and ear length is 1.4–1.6 cm (0.55–0.63 in).

There are nine subspecies of lesser short-nosed fruit bat. Corbet and Hill listed 19 alternate names of C. brachyotis, which include: Pachysoma brachyotis, P. duvaucelii, P. brevicaudatum, P. luzoniense, C. grandidieri, C. marginatus var. scherzeri, C. marginatus var. ceylonensis, C. marginatus var. philippensis, C. marginatus var. cuminggii, C. marginatus var. andamanensis, C. brachyoma, C. montanoi, C. minutus, C. minor, C. babi, C. archipelagus and C. nusatenggara. Kitchener and Maharadatunkamsi considered luzoniensis and minutus as separate species while Hill and Thonglongya transferred angulatus to C. sphinx.

The lifespan of the lesser short-nosed fruit bat is approximately 20 to 30 years.

== Similar species ==
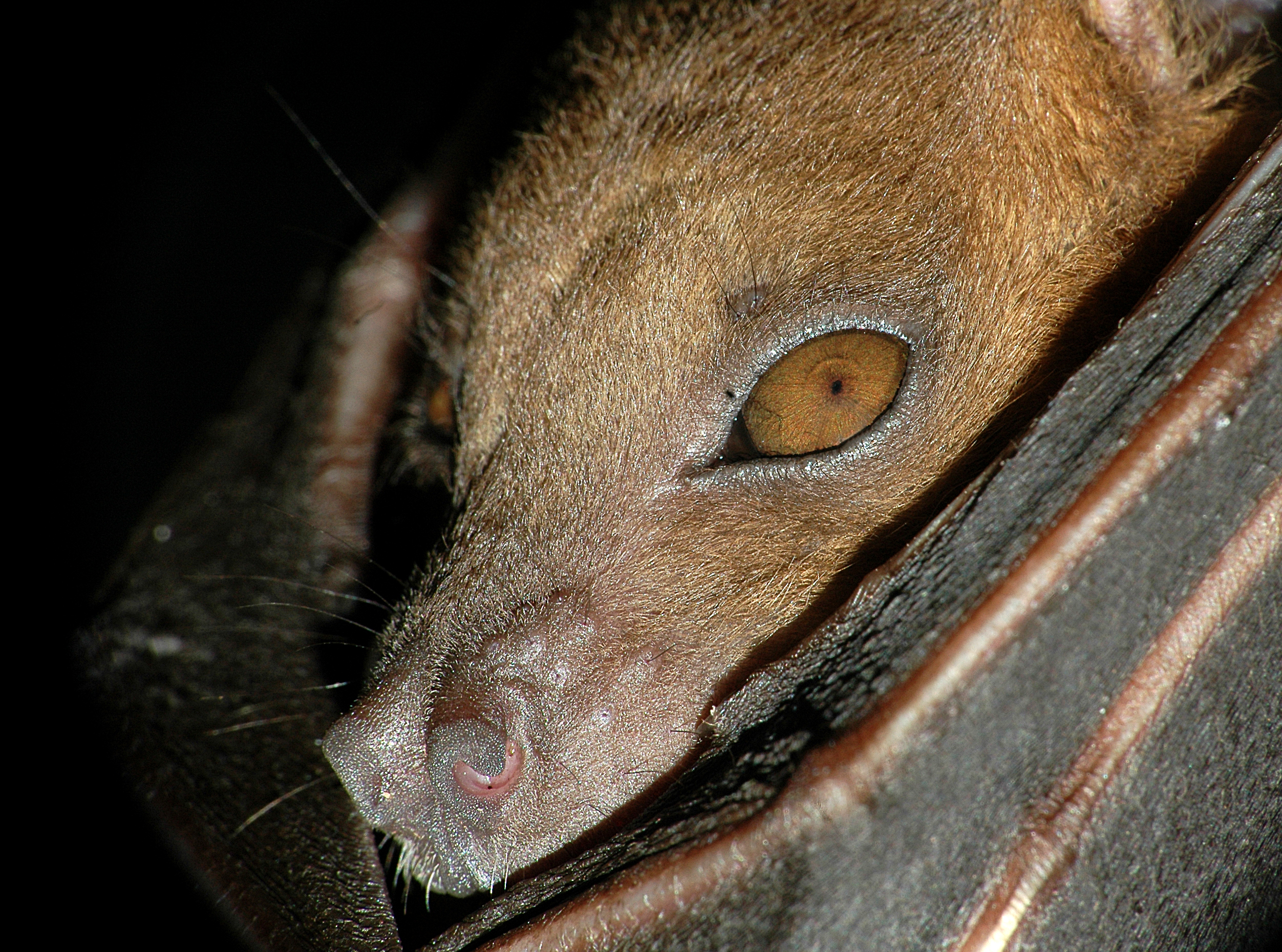
Close-up of face

The greater short-nosed fruit bat is similar to the lesser short-nosed fruit bat but has generally longer forearms, longer ears and a much longer skull. P. lucasi has only one pair of lower incisors, a lack of white edges to the ears and a usually greyer color. C. horsfieldi is larger, with heavily cusped molars. M. ecaudatus usually has a more upturned nose, lacks a bright collar and tail, and has only one pair of lower incisors.

== Diet ==
Lesser short-nosed fruit bats are frugivorous. They prefer aromatic fruit, especially mangoes. The bats feed mainly on small fruits by sucking out the juices and soft pulp. They also eat nectar and pollen.

== Reproduction ==
The mating system of lesser short-nosed fruit bats is polygynous. In the Philippines, most populations give birth twice a year and pregnant females have been found in almost all months. The period of gestation is approximately 3.5 to 4 months. The mother nurses the young with milk for about six to eight weeks. It takes about a year for the male to become sexually mature, and most females become pregnant at approximately six to eight months of age. Medway observed that breeding was non-seasonal in Peninsular Malaysia and that a single young was produced and carried by the female during the early stage of its life. Breeding is also non-seasonal in Thailand. Most pregnancies occur from March to June with peaks in January and September. Lactation corresponds with the peak of the rainy season as well as the fruiting season. Both sexes take care of the young. Males play an active role in lactation and feeding the young. They have mammary glands that are the same size as those of the female and exceed 8% of their overall body mass.

== Behavior ==
Lesser short-nosed fruit bats prefer to roost in small groups in trees, under leaves, and in caves. Young males may roost alone. It is common for one male to roost with up to four females. Females may gather in groups of up to 20. To feed, the bats bite off the center part of palm fruit clusters, leaving a hollow for hanging, which is also the method they use to construct a shelter. Males may spend more than two months chewing the veins of leaves and palm fronds until they fall to form a shelter. Individuals use tactile, visual, and acoustic stimuli to communicate. They forage with their acute sense of smell and navigate with their keen vision.

== Distribution and habitat ==
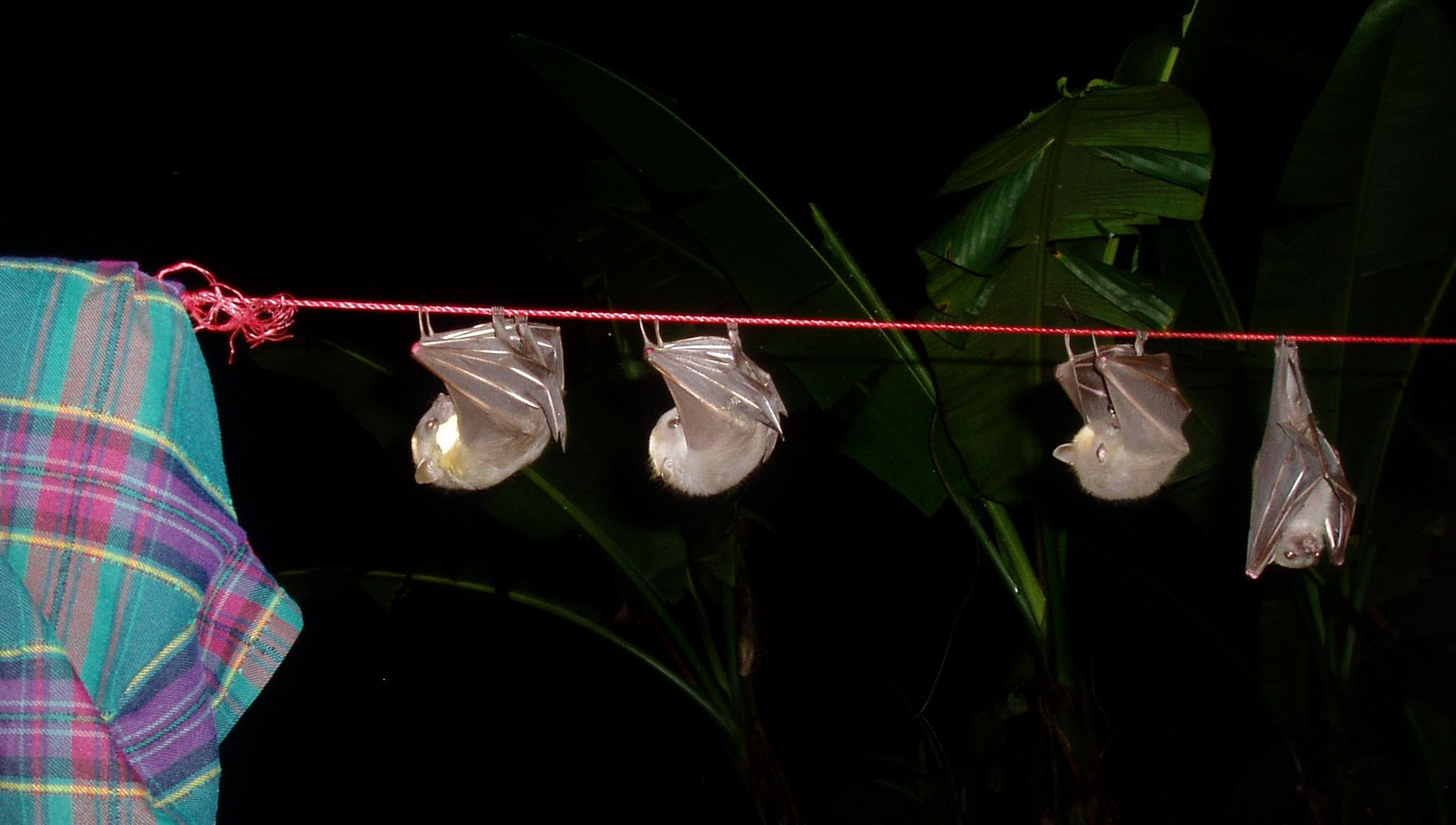
Lesser short-nosed fruit bats resting on a clothesline after being released. The white spots on the tops of their heads are hair that was bleached for a "mark-recapture" estimate of the local population size.

The lesser short-nosed fruit bat type specimens were collected from the Dewei River in Borneo on September 12, 1836, and at Naga Cave near Jammut on the Teweh River, Borneo.

They are widely distributed in Sri Lanka, southwest and northeast India, Bangladesh, Andaman and Nicobar Islands, southern China, southern Burma, Indochina, Thailand, the Malay Peninsula, Sumatra, Java, Bali, Sulawesi, the Philippines and also on the Lesser Sunda Islands. The nominate subspecies, C. b. brachyotis, is distributed in Borneo, Lombok, Peninsular Malaysia, the Philippines and Sulawesi. It is found widespread from sea level to 1,600 metres (5,200 ft) in altitude. C. b. altitudinis is confined to the highlands of Peninsular Malaysia, from the Cameron Highlands to Gunung Bunga Buah. C. b. brachysoma is found on the Andaman Islands; C. b. cylonensis in Sri Lanka; C. b. concolor in Enggano; C. b. hoffetti in Vietnam; C. b. insularum on the Kangean Islands; C. b. javanicus on Java; and C. b. minutus on Nias.

== Ecological and economic importance ==
Lesser short-nosed fruit bats are free of terrestrial predation because of their ability to fly. Some human cultures consume them as a delicacy. They play important roles in plant pollination. Plants such as bananas, avocados, dates, mangoes and peaches depend on them for seed dispersal. The bats are considered to be crop pests since they consume and damage fruit.

== Conservation status ==
Lesser short-nosed fruit bats are designated a least-concern species by the International Commission on Zoological Nomenclature (ICZN) because the population is widely distributed, stable and still abundant. Possible threats may be habitat loss due to development, dams, and deforestation. The animals are being hunted for medical purposes, as reported in ICZN 2006.
