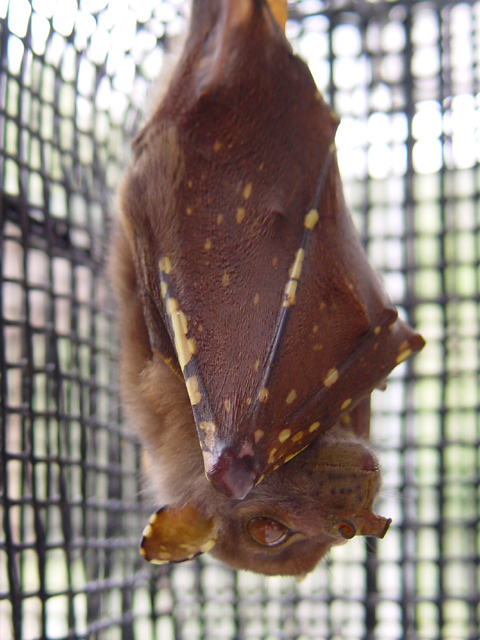
- Eastern tube-nosed bat, Nyctimene robinsoni

Scientific classification
- Kingdom: Animalia
- Phylum: Chordata
- Class: Mammalia
- Order: Chiroptera
- Family: Pteropodidae
- Subfamily: Pteropodinae
- Tribe: Cynopterini
- Subtribe: Nyctimenina
- Genus: Nyctimene; Borkhausen, 1797.

Type species
- Vespertilio cephalotes Pallas, 1767

Species
- See text

= Nyctimene (genus) =

Genus of bats

Nyctimene is a genus of bats in the Pteropodidae family. Commonly known as tube-nosed fruit bats or yoda bats, they are found in the central Philippines, eastern Indonesia, Papua New Guinea, and the northeast coast of Australia.

== Taxonomy ==
The genus was described by Moritz Balthasar Borkhausen in 1797. The name Nyctimene, derived from Ancient Greek, does not mean ‘night moon’ as has been suggested, but roughly 'who stays up at night'.

== Description ==
The facial features of the species are distinguished by projecting nostrils, rather than the simple features of most other megabats, the appearance of which has been likened to a frightened horse.

== Species ==
The recognised taxa are named in the vernacular as tube-nosed fruit bats or tube-nosed bats, and includes the following:

- Broad-striped tube-nosed bat, Nyctimene aello
- Common tube-nosed bat, Nyctimene albiventer
- Pallas's tube-nosed bat, Nyctimene cephalotes
- Dark tube-nosed bat, Nyctimene celaeno
- Mountain tube-nosed bat, Nyctimene certans
- Round-eared tube-nosed bat, Nyctimene cyclotis
- Dragon tube-nosed bat, Nyctimene draconilla
- Keast's tube-nosed bat, Nyctimene keasti
- Island tube-nosed bat, Nyctimene major
- Malaita tube-nosed bat, Nyctimene malaitensis
- Demonic tube-nosed bat, Nyctimene masalai
- Lesser tube-nosed bat, Nyctimene minutus
- Philippine tube-nosed bat, Nyctimene rabori
- Eastern tube-nosed bat, Nyctimene robinsoni
- Nendo tube-nosed bat, Nyctimene sanctacrucis
- Umboi tube-nosed bat, Nyctimene vizcaccia
- New Guinea tube-nosed bat, Nyctimene wrightae
