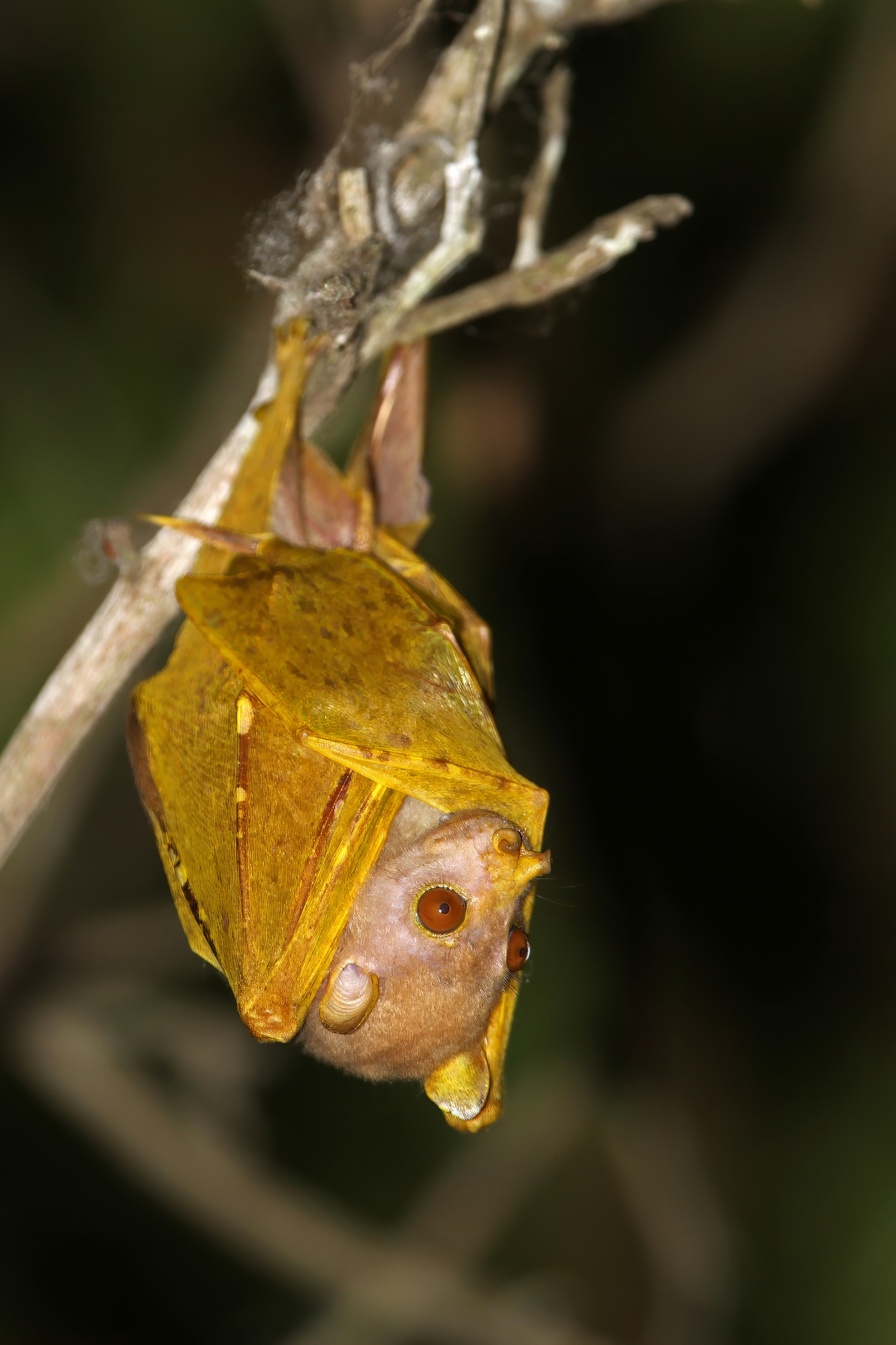

Conservation status
- Least Concern (IUCN 3.1)

Scientific classification
- Kingdom: Animalia
- Phylum: Chordata
- Class: Mammalia
- Order: Chiroptera
- Family: Pteropodidae
- Genus: Nyctimene
- Species: N. cephalotes

Binomial name
- Nyctimene cephalotes (Pallas, 1767)
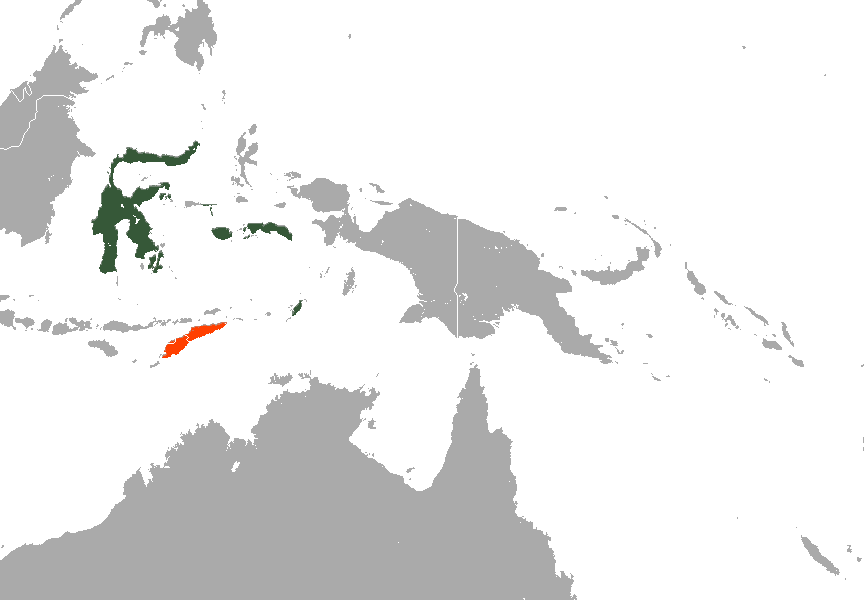
- Pallas's tube-nosed fruit bat range: extant possibly extinct

= Pallas's tube-nosed bat =

Species of bat

Pallas's tube-nosed bat (Nyctimene cephalotes), also known as the Torresian tube-nosed bat or northern tube-nosed bat, is a species of megabat in the Nyctimene genus found in Indonesia. Its range may extend to New Guinea, but sightings may be attributable to misidentification. Its range may at one time also have extended to Timor, but was extirpated due to habitat loss.

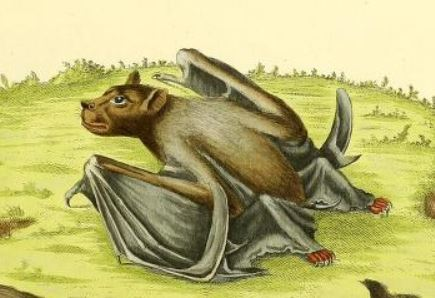
Nyctimene cephalotes, formerly Vespertilio cephalotes, illustrated in 1774 by Schreber
