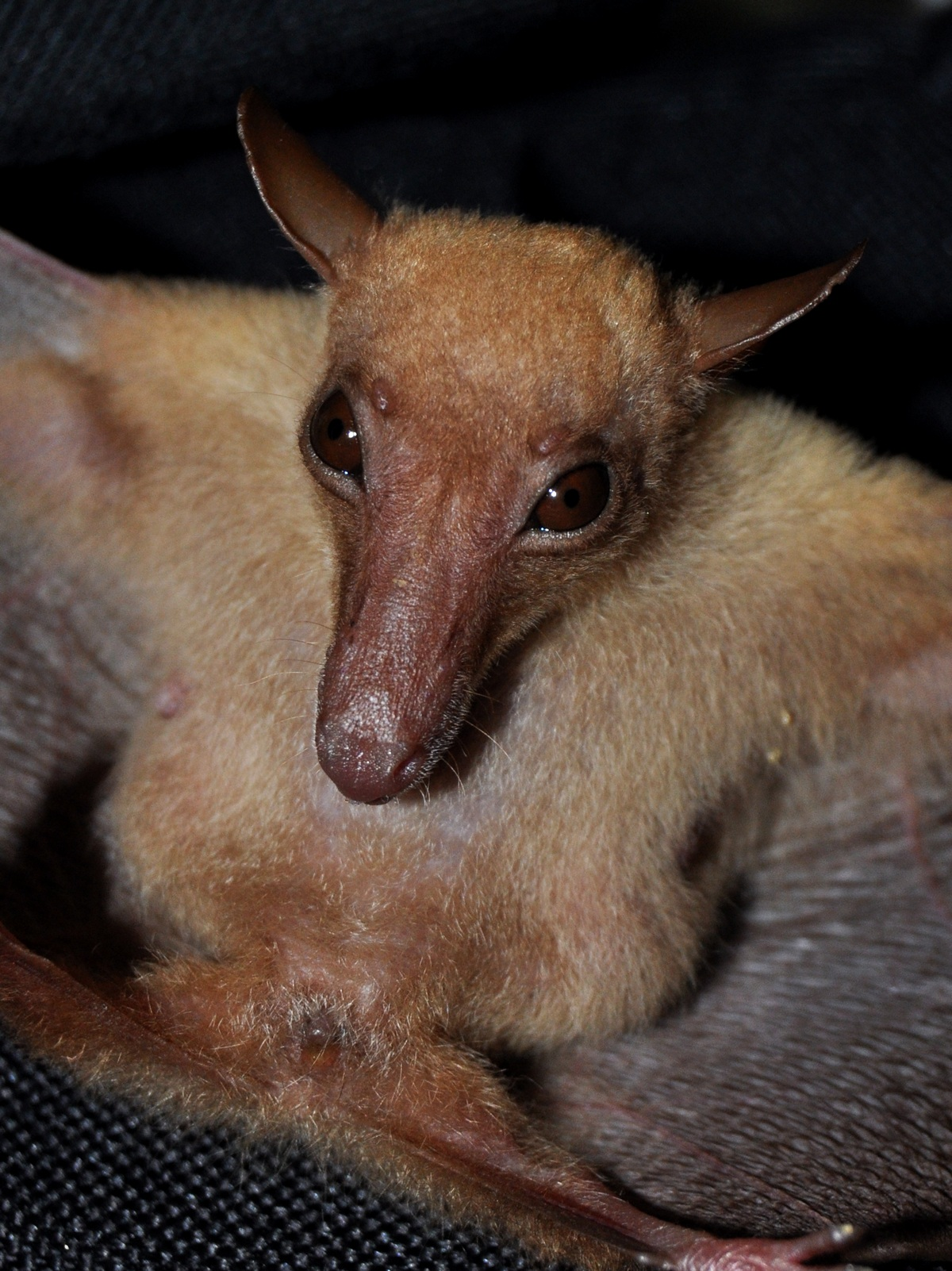
- Long-tongued fruit bat (Macroglossus sobrinus)

Scientific classification
- Domain: Eukaryota
- Kingdom: Animalia
- Phylum: Chordata
- Class: Mammalia
- Order: Chiroptera
- Family: Pteropodidae
- Subfamily: Macroglossinae; Gray, 1866

Genera
- Macroglossus; Melonycteris; Syconycteris

= Macroglossusinae =

Macroglossinae

Subfamily of bats

The megabat subfamily Macroglossusinae is within the family Pteropodidae.

Subfamily Macroglossusinae

- Genus Macroglossus - long-tongued fruit bats
  - Long-tongued nectar bat, Macroglossus minimus
  - Long-tongued fruit bat, Macroglossus sobrinus
- Genus Melonycteris
  - Fardoulis's blossom bat, Melonycteris fardoulisi
  - Black-bellied fruit bat, Melonycteris melanops
  - Woodford's fruit bat, Melonycteris woodfordi
- Genus Syconycteris - blossom bats
  - Common blossom bat, Syconycteris australis
  - Halmahera blossom bat, Syconycteris carolinae
  - Moss-forest blossom bat, Syconycteris hobbit
