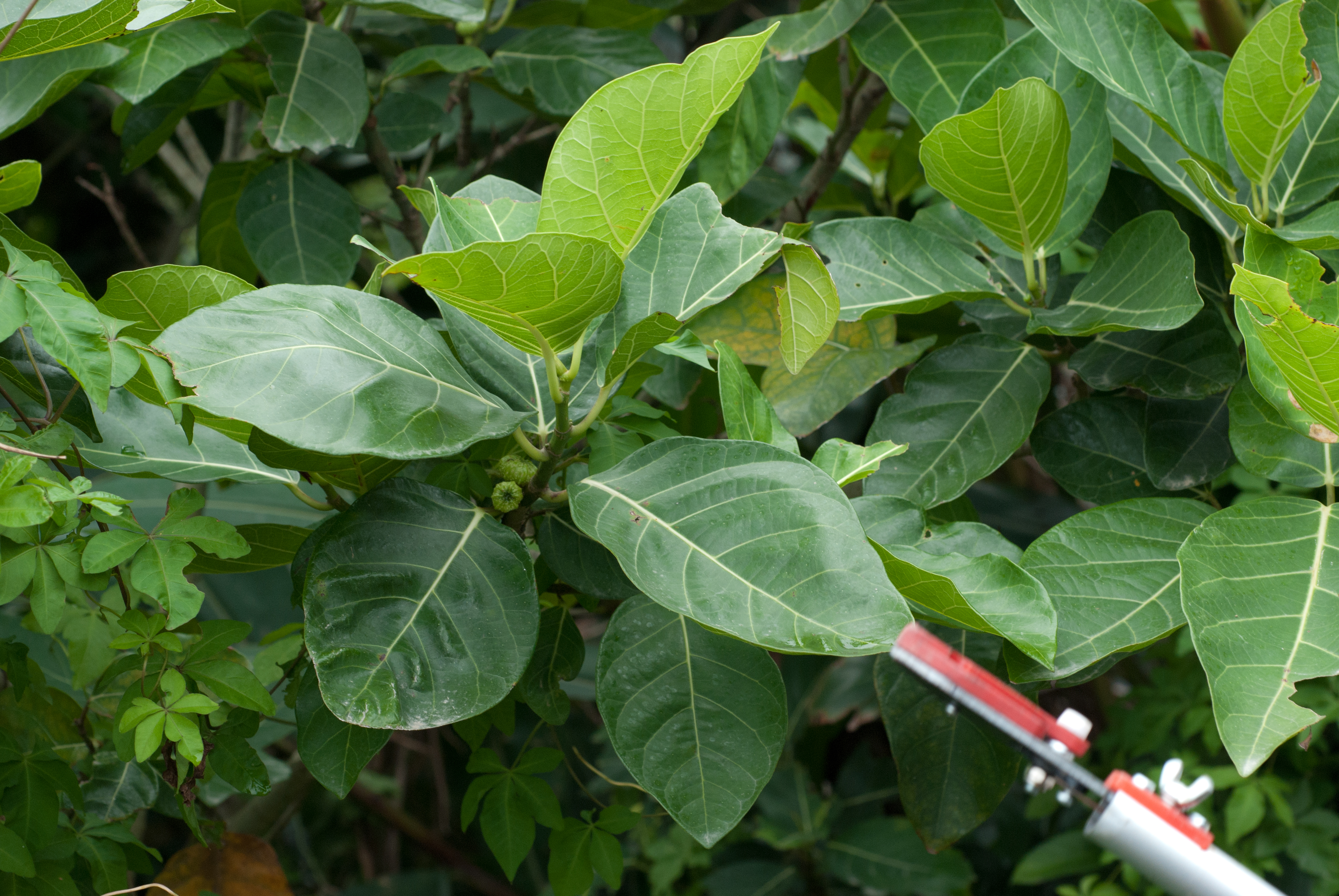
- In Taiwan

Conservation status
- Least Concern (IUCN 3.1)

Scientific classification
- Kingdom: Plantae
- Clade: Tracheophytes
- Clade: Angiosperms
- Clade: Eudicots
- Clade: Rosids
- Order: Rosales
- Family: Moraceae
- Genus: Ficus
- Subgenus: F. subg. Sycomorus
- Species: F. septica

Binomial name
- Ficus septica Burm.f.

Synonyms
- Synonymy: Covellia leucantatoma (Poir.) Miq.; Covellia leucopleura (Blume) Miq.; Covellia radiata (Decne.) Miq.; Covellia rapiformis (Roxb.) Miq.; Covellia stictocarpa; Covellia venosa Miq.; Ficus brunnea Merr.; Ficus casearia; Ficus didymophylla; Ficus eburnea W.Bull; Ficus geminifolia; Ficus hauilii; Ficus kaukauensis; Ficus laccifera; Ficus laxiramea; Ficus leucantatoma; Ficus leucopleura; Ficus leucosticta; Ficus leucotoma Roem. & Schult.; Ficus linearis; Ficus oldhamii; Ficus paludosa Perr.; Ficus philippense Hérincq; Ficus radiata; Ficus rapiformis; Ficus septica var. cauliflora Corner; Ficus septica var. salicifolia Corner; Ficus stictocarpa (Miq.) Miq.; Ficus venosa; Ficus verrucosa

= Ficus septica =

Species of fig

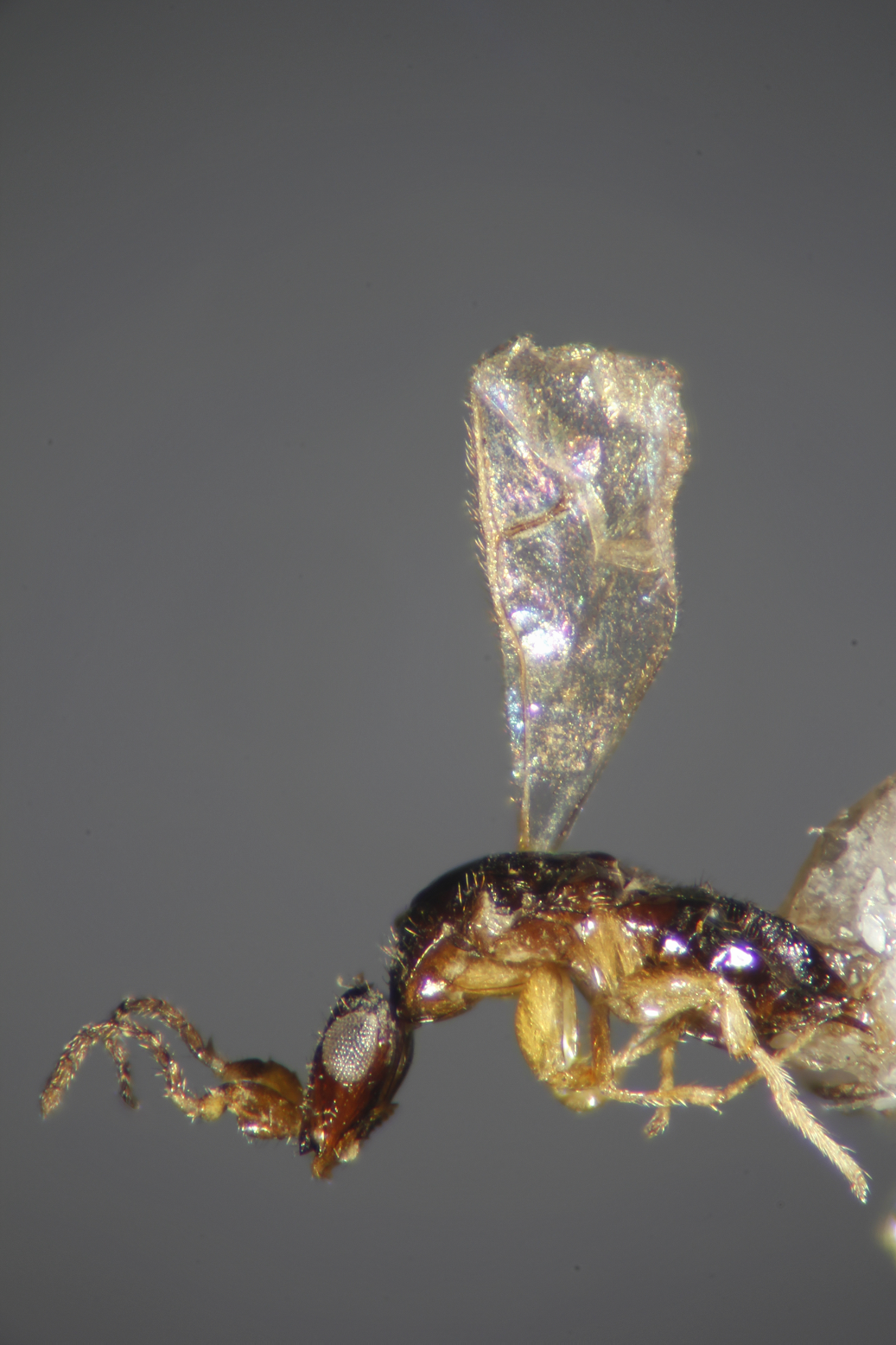
Pollinating fig wasp (Ceratosolen sp.) collected on Ficus septica from south of Taiwan

Ficus septica, also known as the Hauili fig tree, is a species of shrub or tree in the family Moraceae. It is native to Malesia, Taiwan, the Ryukyu Islands, Papuasia, Queensland in northern Australia, the Santa Cruz Islands, and Vanuatu. It grows in lowland tropical moist forests, often at forest edges and in degraded environments. The seeds of this species are dispersed by numerous species, including fruit bats (Megachiroptera) when present.

== Taxonomy ==
Ficus septica was described first by the Dutch botanist Nicolaas Laurens Burman in 1768. Two centuries later, E. J. H. Corner listed three varieties for Ficus septica: F. septica var. septica distributed all over the range of the species; F. septica var. cauliflora limited to Queensland, Australia and the Solomon Islands; and F. septica var. salicifolia endemic to the Philippines Islands. Then in the latest Flora Malesiana edition, Cornelis Christiaan Berg put all these varieties in synonymy together under the name Ficus septica. Within the genus, Ficus septica belongs to the subgenus Sycomorus section Sycocarpus subsection Sycocarpus.

== Description ==
Tree or shrub up to 25 meters. The latex of F. septica is characteristically yellow. Leaves and petioles are both glabrous. Leaves are symmetric, elliptic to oblong. Figs grow often in pairs but can be solitary or in groups of up to four. Figs are depressed-globose to ellipsoid, the apex is flat or concave. Seven to twelve ribs towards to ostiole. At maturity, whitish to yellowish dots appear on the fig. The individuals from Philippines have their stems covered by short hairs while those found in Taiwan are glabrous.

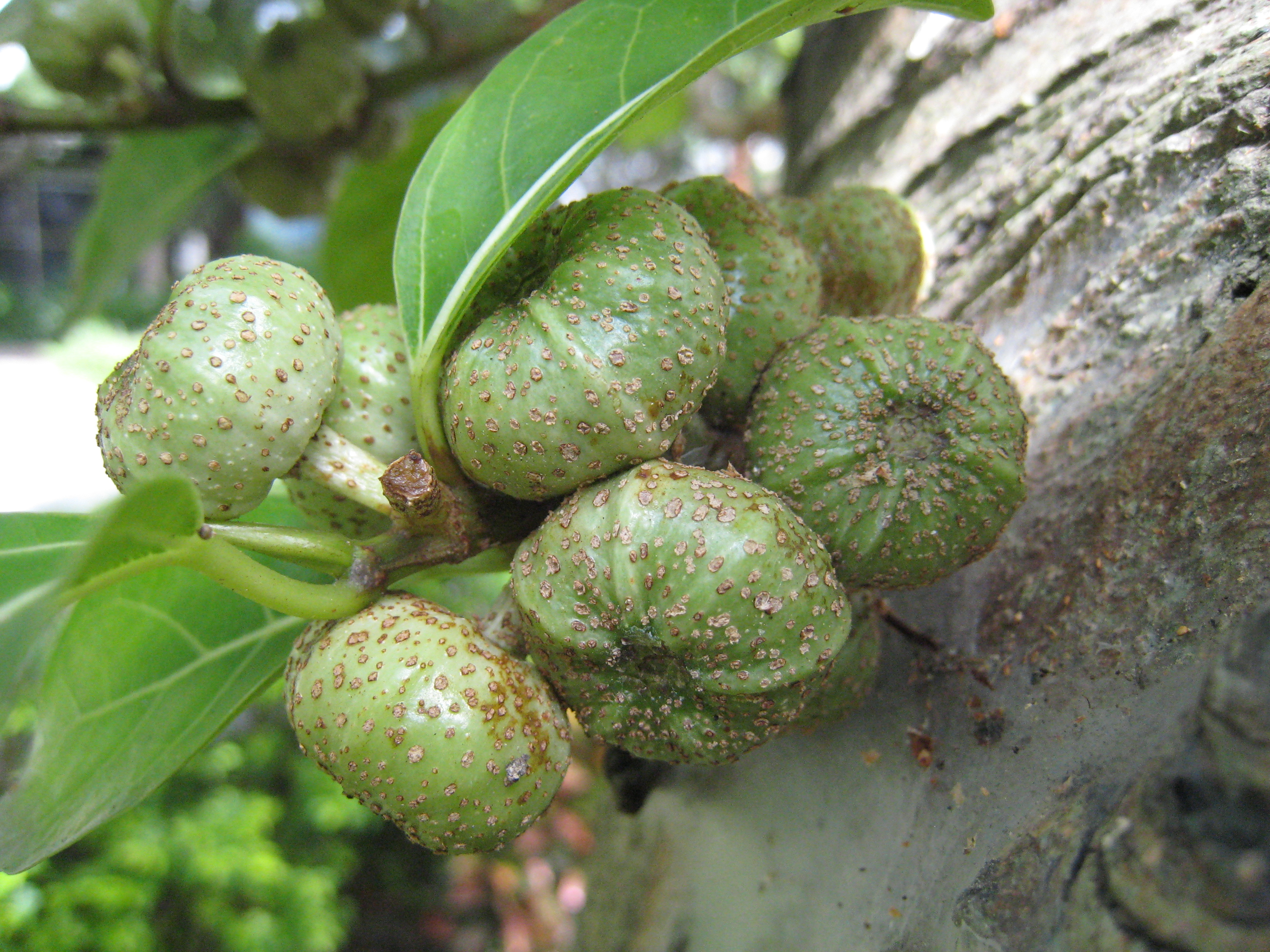
Ficus septica pollinated figs

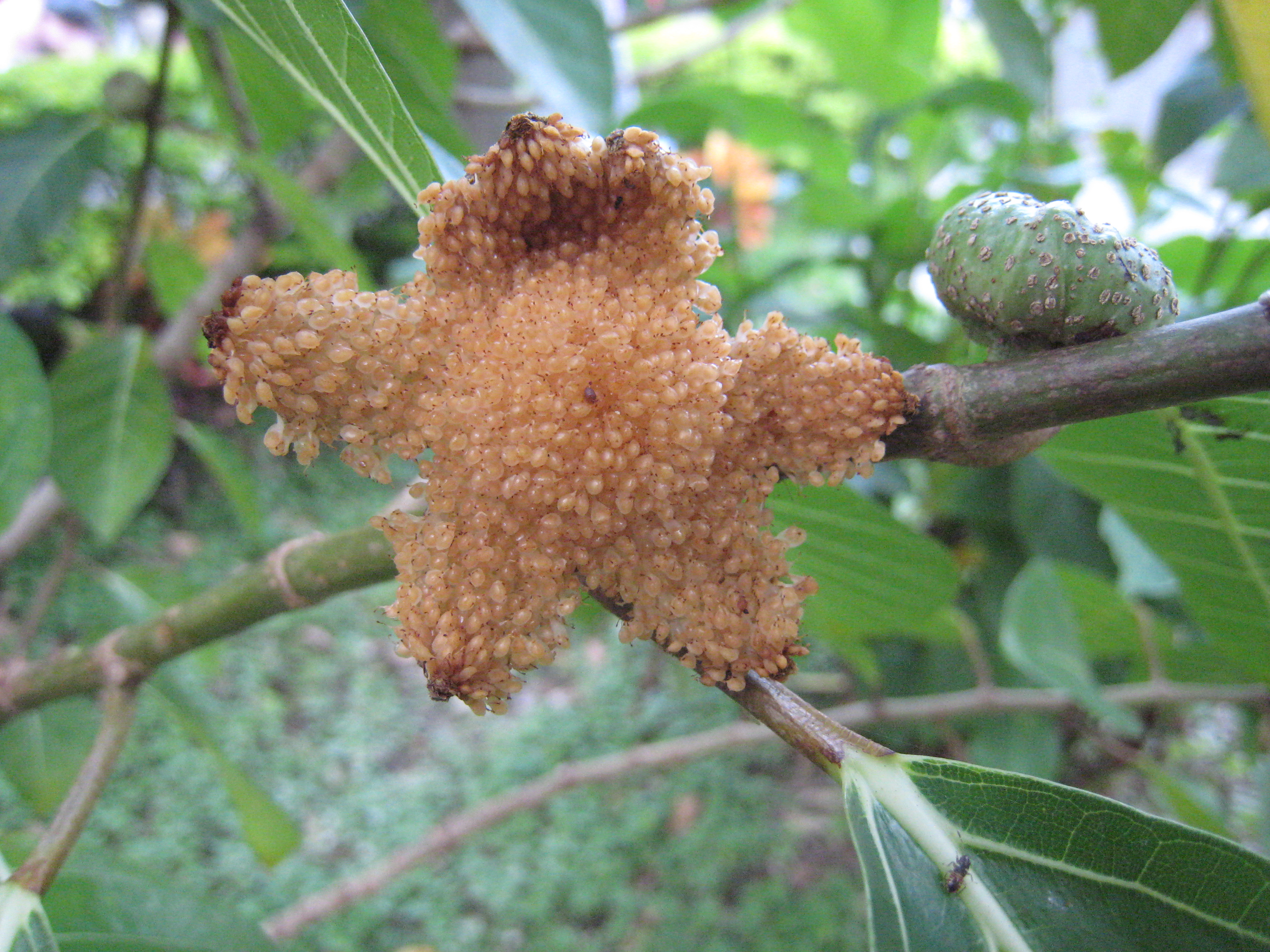
Ficus septica female fig at maturity in National Taiwan University Campus, Taipei, Taiwan

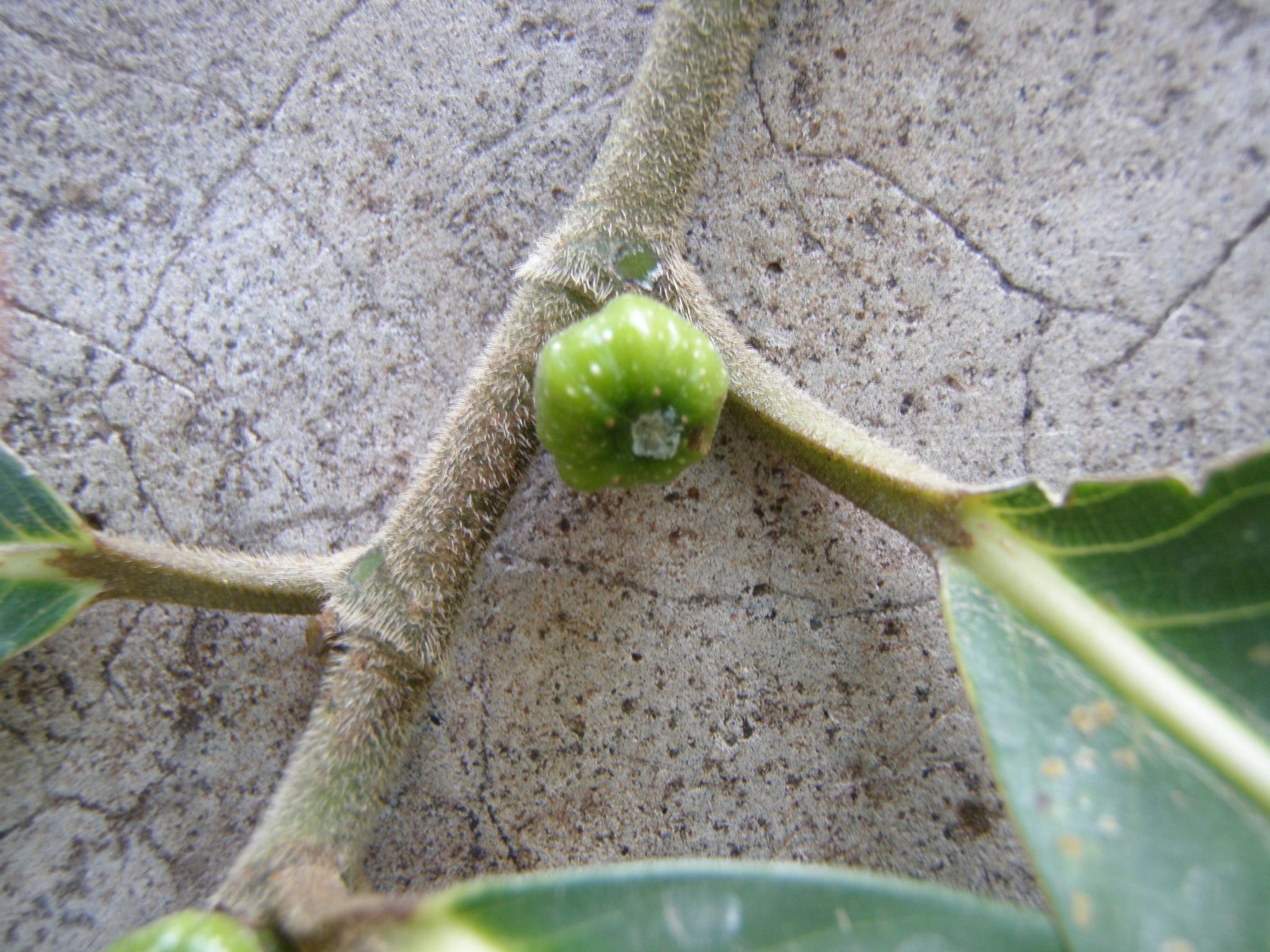
Ficus septica branch with unpollinated fig in University of the Philippines Diliman campus, Philippines

== Habitat ==
Ficus septica trees live up to 1800m in montane forests or secondary growth environments. It can be seen often along rivers. In Taiwan, at the northern limit of its distribution, F. septica lives up to 500m in secondary growths and along roads and coastlines.

== Ecology ==
Ficus septica is pollinated by fig wasps from the genus Ceratosolen, of which the best known is C. bisulcatus. Usually members of the genus Ficus are pollinated by a single species of pollinating fig wasps specific to each fig species, but recent observations of Ficus septica have shown there to be three pollinating species in southern Taiwan and two in the Philippines.

The figs of Ficus septica have been reported to be eaten by 22 animal species and among them 14 are bats:

- Double-eyed fig parrot
- Unspecified fruit dove
- Black-naped oriole
- Northern common cuscus
- Stein's cuscus
- Common spotted cuscus
- Mantled guereza
- Black rat
- Lesser short-nosed fruit bat
- Horsfield's fruit bat
- Greater short-nosed fruit bat
- Indonesian short-nosed fruit bat
- Bare-backed fruit bat
- Lesser naked-backed fruit bat
- Long-tongued nectar bat
- Long-tongued fruit bat
- Broad-striped tube-nosed fruit bat
- Common tube-nosed fruit bat
- Greater musky fruit bat
- Geoffroy's rousette
- Common blossom bat
