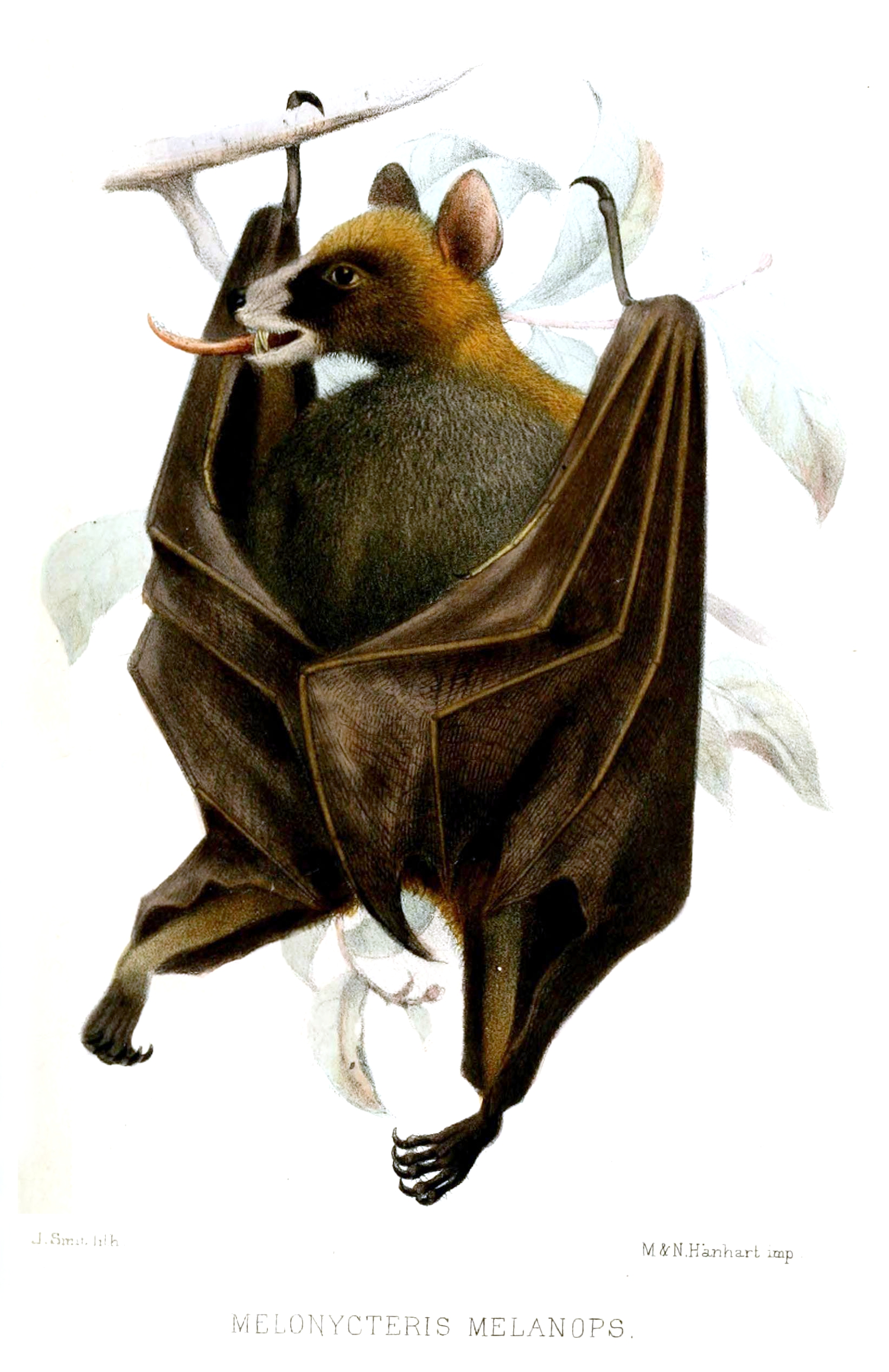

Conservation status
- Least Concern (IUCN 3.1)

Scientific classification
- Kingdom: Animalia
- Phylum: Chordata
- Class: Mammalia
- Order: Chiroptera
- Family: Pteropodidae
- Genus: Melonycteris
- Species: M. melanops

Binomial name
- Melonycteris melanops Dobson, 1877
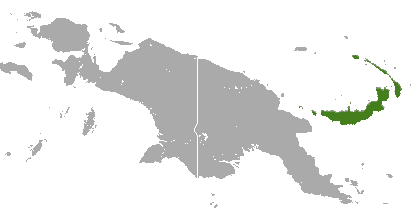
- Black-bellied fruit bat range

= Black-bellied fruit bat =

Species of bat

The black-bellied fruit bat (Melonycteris melanops) is a species of order bat in the family Pteropodidae.

== Ecology ==
Black-bellied fruit bats are endemic to the subtropical or tropical Bismarck Archipelago of Papua New Guinea. They range from sea level up to 1,600 m. Adult bats maintain a home range between 0.5 and 9.2 ha, and a core feeding area of 1 to 9 trees with active florescence. These bats enjoy the rare advantage of thriving in the changes that humans have brought to its habitat. Most of these bats now live and eat in the banana trees of the privately owned traditional gardens and the cocoa plantations.

Black-bellied fruit bats feed on the fruit and nectar of giant native bananas and cocoa. They collect nectar by rapidly pumping their long tongues into the flowers.

== Description ==
Black-bellied fruit bats can weigh up to 63 grams (2.2 oz), average 94 millimetres (3.7 in) in length and have an average forelimb measurement of 60 millimetres (2.4 in). They have a unique countershading pattern of a black underside and burnt orange backs.

== Behavior ==
Both males and females are resource defenders and strictly control their home range. The only crossover in home ranges is between consort pairs. Adults of the same gender are never allowed to invade a home range. Black-bellied bats spend less than 36% of their time flying while actively foraging. By feeding at the source instead of carrying fruit back to their roost they are able to spend less time flying then other fruit bats. Mean flight time of individual flights ranges from 20.8 to 30.7 seconds, with up to 99 flights in 2 hours.

During the day, this flying fox usually roosts among dry banana leaves, a perfect camouflage given its burnt orange and black fur pattern. They roost alone, primarily within 100 m of their core-use feeding area, except for sub-adult bats who roost more than 400 m from their most frequented foraging grounds. Sub-adult bats often have not established a territory yet and have to wait for a home range to become available or fight to claim one.

== Physiology ==
Black-bellied fruit bats are endothermic but are poor thermoregulators. Ambient temperature plays a role in determining their body temperature. They are thermally neutral from 28 to 33 °C (82 to 91 °F), from 28 to 16 °C (82 to 61 °F) the bats' body temperature drops about 3 degrees and oxygen consumption increases by 2 cm^3/(g.hr). They have a basal rate metabolism of only 74% of what is expected for a mammal of its size.

Black-bellied fruit bats may enter torpor below 20 °C (68 °F), but the percentage is small.

== Phylogeny ==
The black-bellied fruit bat is most closely related to Fardoulis's blossom bat, and then to the long-tongued nectar bat and the common blossom bat. The black-bellied back has been shown through research to be "strongly indicated as sister taxon to all other megachiropterans" and to be a primitive form of the Pteropodidae.
