= Beaufort's naked-backed fruit bat =

Conservation status
- Least Concern (IUCN 3.1)

Scientific classification
- Kingdom: Animalia
- Phylum: Chordata
- Class: Mammalia
- Order: Chiroptera
- Family: Pteropodidae
- Genus: Dobsonia
- Species: D. beauforti

Binomial name
- Dobsonia beauforti Bergmans, 1975
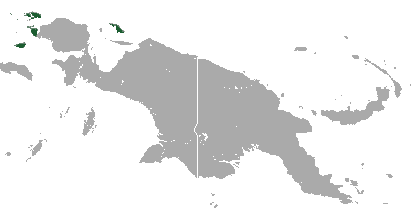
- Beaufort's naked-backed fruit bat range in Western New Guinea

Species of bat

Beaufort's naked-backed fruit bat (Dobsonia beauforti) is a species of megabat in the family Pteropodidae. It roosts in caves.

== Taxonomy and etymology ==
Beaufort's naked-backed fruit bat was described as a new species in 1975 by W. Bergmans. The holotype was collected in 1909 by Lieven Ferdinand de Beaufort in Waigeo, Indonesia. De Beaufort is the eponym for the species name "beauforti."

== Description ==
Its ears, flight membranes, and back lacks fur. Its forearm length is 99.6–111.4 mm (3.92–4.39 in). It is sexually dimorphic, with males larger than females. Males are also a bright, yellowish-green in contrast to the drab brown fur of the females. It is similar in appearance to the greenish naked-backed fruit bat, with which it may be confused.

== Range and habitat ==
It is endemic to Indonesia, where its range includes the Raja Ampat, Biak, and Supiori islands in Cenderawasih Bay.

== Conservation ==
As of 2016, it is listed as a least-concern species by the IUCN.
