= Halmahera naked-backed fruit bat =

Conservation status
- Least Concern (IUCN 3.1)

Scientific classification
- Kingdom: Animalia
- Phylum: Chordata
- Class: Mammalia
- Order: Chiroptera
- Family: Pteropodidae
- Genus: Dobsonia
- Species: D. crenulata

Binomial name
- Dobsonia crenulata K. Andersen, 1909
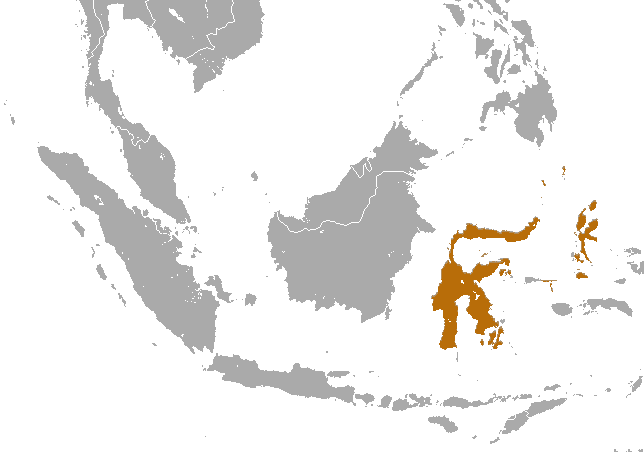
- Halmahera naked-backed fruit bat range

Species of bat

The Halmahera naked-backed fruit bat (Dobsonia crenulata) is a common and widespread species of megabat in the family Pteropodidae. It is endemic to Indonesia. The bat's non-Moluccan populations are apparently an undescribed separate sub-species.

== Description ==
With its greenish-colored fur, Dobsonia crenulata is similar in appearance to the greenish naked-backed fruit bat, but is larger and has heavier dentition. Births probably take place in December.

== Distribution and habitat ==
The bat is endemic to Indonesia and found on the northern Moluccas, Togian Islands, Sangihe Islands, Talaud Islands, Pelang, Sulawesi, Muno, Buton, Peleng, Kabaena, Mangole, Sanana, Halmahera, Siau, Sangihe, Karekelang and Hoga Island. It occurs up to 1,000 meters above sea level.

It is commonly found in gardens and disturbed forest. It is not dependent on water. It roosts in caves, trees, and rock crevices. This species lives in large colonies.

== Conservation ==
It is assessed as least-concern by the IUCN. The species is common and widespread throughout its range and seems to fac no major threats. However, hunting and limestone extraction in its habitat in southern Sulawesi may be localised threats.
