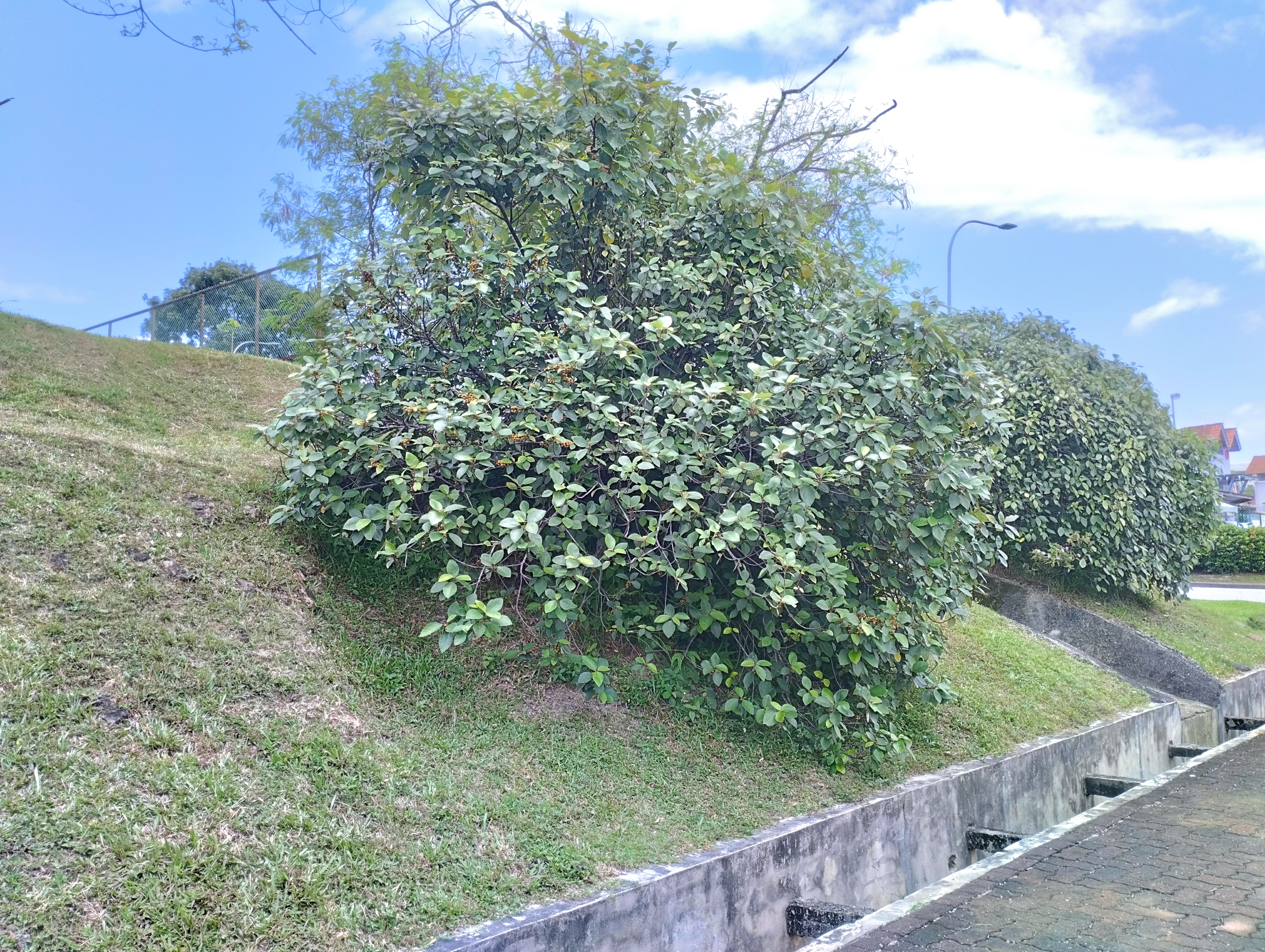

Conservation status
- Least Concern (IUCN 3.1)

Scientific classification
- Kingdom: Plantae
- Clade: Tracheophytes
- Clade: Angiosperms
- Clade: Eudicots
- Clade: Rosids
- Order: Rosales
- Family: Moraceae
- Genus: Ficus
- Subgenus: F. subg. Ficus
- Species: F. grossularioides

Binomial name
- Ficus grossularioides Burm.f., Fl. Ind. (1768)

Varieties
- Ficus grossularioides var. grossularioides; Ficus grossularioides var. kingii (Kuntze) C.C.Berg & Corner; Ficus grossularioides var. stenoloba Corner

Synonyms
- Synonymy: synonyms of var. grossularioides: Ficus alba Reinw. ex Blume; Ficus alba var. gossypina (Wall. ex Miq.) Kuntze; Ficus alba var. mappan (Miq.) Miq.; Ficus alba var. nudinervis Kuntze; Ficus bicolor Hook. ex Miq.; Ficus chloroleuca Miq.; Ficus gossypina Wall. ex Miq.; Ficus gossypina f. integrifolia Miq.; Ficus gossypina f. lobata Miq.; Ficus hunteri Miq.; Ficus lobata W.Hunter; Ficus mappan Miq.; Ficus nivea Blume; Ficus palamoides Voigt; Ficus palmata Roxb., nom. illeg. homonym. post. synonyms of var. kingii: Ficus alba var. kingii Kuntze

= Ficus grossularioides =

Species of flowering plant

Ficus grossularioides, the white-leaved fig, is a species of flowering plant that belongs to Moraceae, the fig or mulberry family, it is native to Southeast Asia.

== Description ==
It is a small dioecious evergreen tree or shrub with a small trunk of only 15 cm in diameter. The bark of the trunk is thorn-less with a light brown reflection, with a smooth texture. It exudes a milky white latex exudate profusely. It can grow up to a height of 13 m (43 ft) in natural conditions and has glabrous twigs around 0.2-0.5 cm thick that are reddish brown.

The leaves are elliptic to obovate in shape and are serrated from the mid margin to the tip, thin-coriaceous, glaucous, and velvety hairy on the underside, with very rough hairs on the topside. They are 19–11.5 cm long and 5.5–3.5 cm broad, with a 1.5–11.5 cm petiole. They are simple to trilobed and are spirally arranged on branches. The leaves have 4- 6 pairs of lateral veins, sunken on the top side, raised on the underside, basal pair reaching about half the length of the blade, with an oil gland in each axil on the underside.

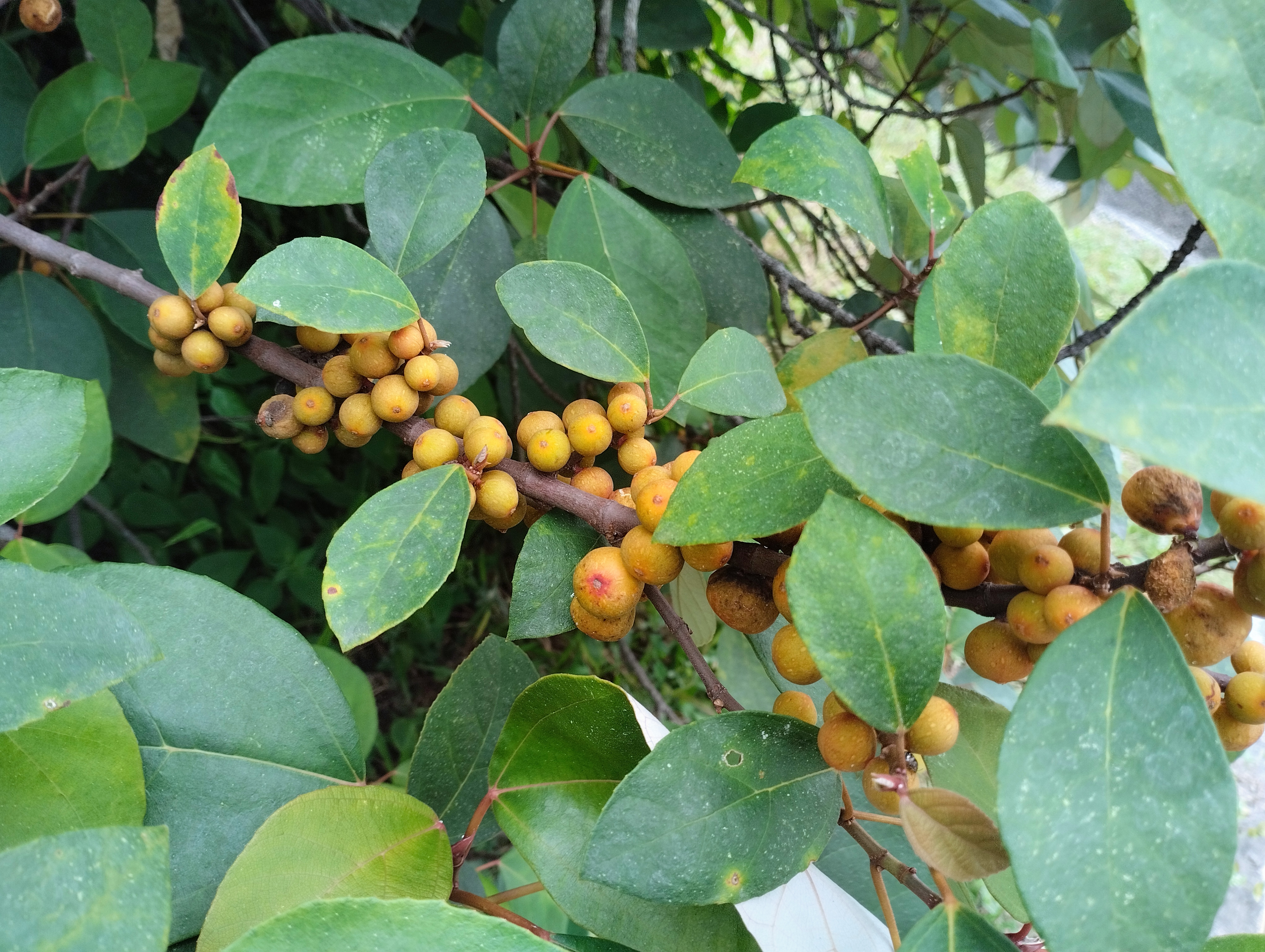
Figs from Ficus grossularioides on the side of a road in Malaysia

The fruits are small ellipsoid to subglobose figs that grow along the twigs, 0.8–1 cm in diameter, light green initially, ripening to a yellowish brown, but sometimes to orange or red. The figs closely resemble Gooseberries.

== Distribution ==
The species can be found in Peninsular Thailand, Peninsular Malaysia, Singapore, Borneo, Sumatra, and Java.

It is common throughout most of Kalimantan (In the mountains of Kalimantan it is replaced by the much rarer F. tricolor) and Sarawak, growing in most secondary forests. In Brunei however, it is uncommon and cannot be found in Sabah where its ecological niche is occupied by Ficus septica. The non-overlapping ranges of these two common species in Borneo's secondary forest figs is quite possibly related to the basic competitive exclusion principle, but this is currently unconfirmed as studies on the ecology of the two species are currently lacking.

== Local names ==
- Called Kukan by the Bidayuh ethnic group
- Called Kupan or Kumpan by the Iban ethnic group
- also called Lenakan, Lengkan or Lelingkan by the Iban

== Ecology ==
=== Habitat ===
It can be found in various habitats, from dry disturbed sandy soils, kerangas forest, swamps, paddy and oil palm plantations, riverbanks, sandy coastal forests, and up to 400 m in elevation. The species is commonly found on the edges of forests as it is usually among the first species to re-establish in a disturbed habitat.

=== Reproduction ===
Ficus grossularioides is associated with a fig wasp, an agaonid wasp that acts as its sole pollinator as this wasp lays its eggs only on trees of this species. All fig trees have this unique form of fertilization, with each species relying on a single specialized species of pollinating wasp that relies on the fig tree to reproduce.

The fruits are then eaten by birds, bats, and other mammals, later distributing the seeds via their fecal matter

== Uses ==
The species is not usually cultivated as it is a commonly found plant and all products from it are collected from wild plants, traditional medicine uses latex against scorpion stings and leaf extract (decoction) is used against kidney complaints. Young shoots are reported to be edible and can be eaten raw.
