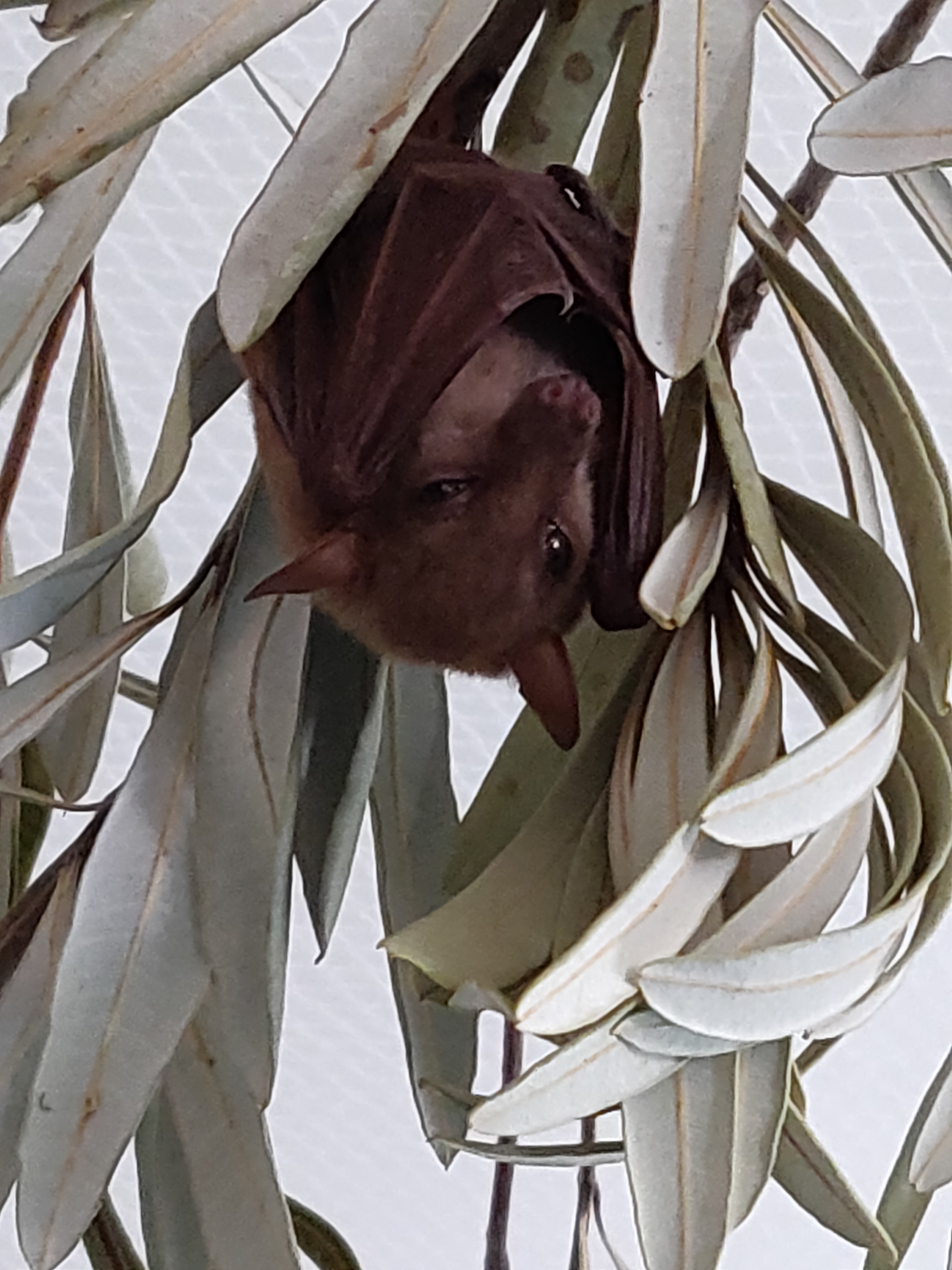
- Syconycteris australis, common blossom bat, in Banksia integrifolia branch (male, temporarily in captivity in Australia).

Scientific classification
- Kingdom: Animalia
- Phylum: Chordata
- Class: Mammalia
- Order: Chiroptera
- Family: Pteropodidae
- Subfamily: Macroglossinae
- Genus: Syconycteris; Matschie, 1899

Type species
- Macroglossus minimus var. australis Peters, 1867

Species
- Syconycteris carolinae Syconycteris hobbit Syconycteris australis

= Syconycteris =

Genus of bats

Syconycteris (blossom bat) is a genus of megabat in the family Pteropodidae. There are three described species at present, with more likely to be added. Members of this genus are found in Indonesia, New Guinea and Australia. Their diet mainly consists of nectar and fruit, making them important for pollination and seed dispersal in their environment.

Syconycteris bats play an especially important role as pollinators for flowers that require an explosive opening such as Mucuna macrocarpa. This is where the stamen and pistill are covered until exposed by an animal. Syconycteris opens the flower by pushing their snout into the basal section between the banner and carina and then pressing their wings to open. Syconycteris bats are primary pollinators as the pollen of explosively opened flowers sticks to their fur.

Syconycteris is a long tongued nectar feeding bat. They are small compared to other megabats and swarm around tall fruit trees. Like closely related Macroglossus species, their vocalizations consist of a long series of similar trill like bursts with high repetition rate and small changes in dominant frequency. They vocalize when distressed and when fighting against other bats over food. The similarity to the echolocating bat Rousettus has led to hypthotheses that Syconycteris is also capable of echolocation.

The Etolo tribe of New Guinea will sometimes include Syconycteris bats in their diet, along with other bats.

Syconycteris is unique among megabats bats because they do not produce spats. Spats are created by slow feeding bats that chew and swallow the juices of their food while pressing the pulp and seeds into a spat or wadge which is then spit out. This makes them more effective seed dispersers because seeds in spats tend to travel less distance and are more vulnerable to fungi compared to seeds that are defecated like those eaten by Syconycteris.

== Taxonomy ==
They are part of the Australasian nectarivorous clade along with the genus Macroglossus. Its placement in this clade has changed over time as studies in DNA testing have grown more in depth. Previously the two were thought to make up Cynopterinae, but it was later found the Cynopterinae is monophyletic and not closely related to Syconycteris. The experiment was the most inclusive analysis of molecular data for pteropodids to date. It used data from five loci. Four mitochondrial and one nuclear gene representing 43 species including exemplars from seven cynopterine genera. Later reanalysis with more sequences using different substitution to gap costs resulted in the current classification. Inclusion of 236 non-molecular characters, mostly morphological, supported the trees. Nyctimeninae and Cynopterinae were found to not be closely related to Syconycteris as previously thought because both are monophyletic. Grouping Syconycteris with Macroglossus has been supported by further studies into mitochondrial DNA. Syconycteris has appeared only recently in the fossil records with no ancestor fossils recovered yet.

== Species ==
- Halmahera blossom bat, Syconycteris carolinae
- Moss-forest blossom bat, Syconycteris hobbit
- Common blossom bat, Syconycteris australis
