= New Britain naked-backed fruit bat =

Conservation status
- Least Concern (IUCN 3.1)

Scientific classification
- Kingdom: Animalia
- Phylum: Chordata
- Class: Mammalia
- Order: Chiroptera
- Family: Pteropodidae
- Genus: Dobsonia
- Species: D. praedatrix

Binomial name
- Dobsonia praedatrix K. Andersen, 1909
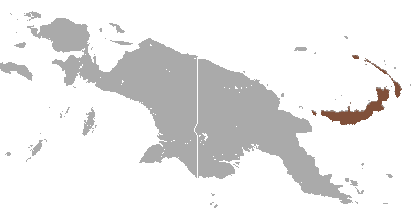
- New Britain naked-backed fruit bat range

Species of bat

The New Britain naked-backed fruit bat (Dobsonia praedatrix) is a species of megabat in the family Pteropodidae. It is endemic to New Britain island in northern Papua New Guinea.
