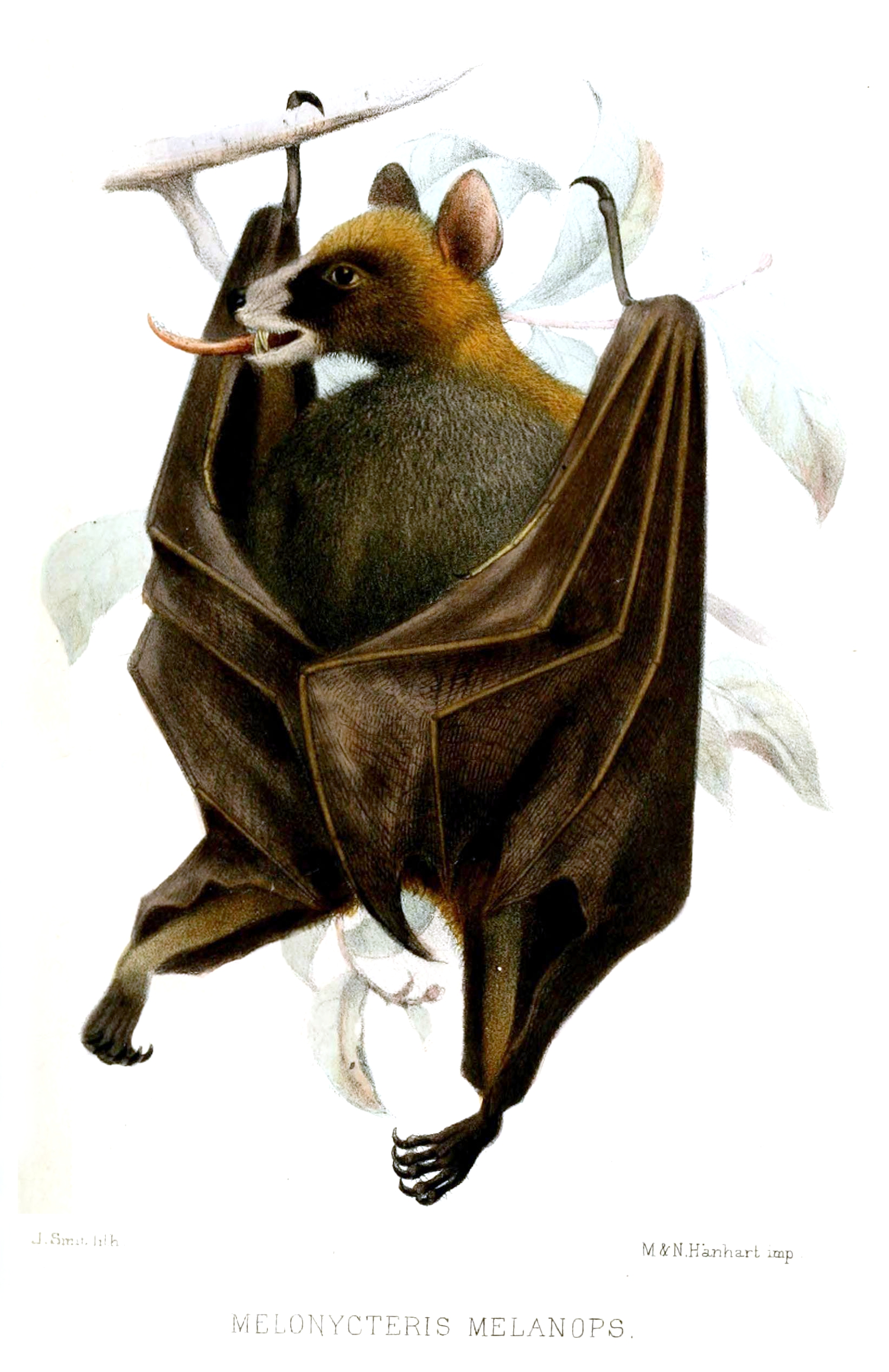
- Black-bellied fruit bat (Melonycteris melanops)

Scientific classification
- Kingdom: Animalia
- Phylum: Chordata
- Class: Mammalia
- Order: Chiroptera
- Family: Pteropodidae
- Subfamily: Macroglossinae
- Genus: Melonycteris; Dobson, 1877

Type species
- Melonycteris melanops Dobson, 1877

Species
- See text

= Melonycteris =

Genus of bats

Melonycteris (dark blossom bat) is a genus of megabat in the family Pteropodidae. Members are found in the Solomon Islands or in the case of the black-bellied fruit bat, in Papua New Guinea.

It contains the following species:

- Fardoulis's blossom bat, Melonycteris fardoulisi
- Black-bellied fruit bat, Melonycteris melanops
- Woodford's fruit bat, Melonycteris woodfordi
