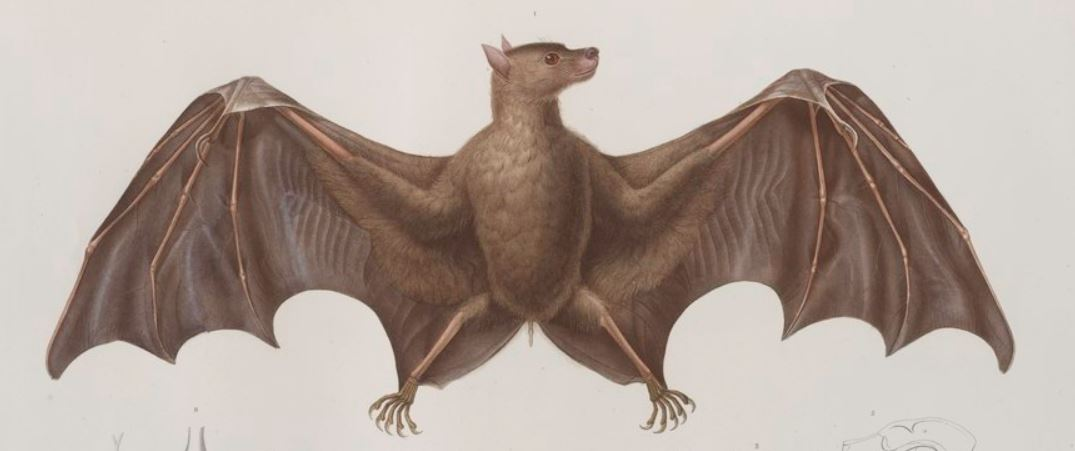

Conservation status
- Least Concern (IUCN 3.1)

Scientific classification
- Kingdom: Animalia
- Phylum: Chordata
- Class: Mammalia
- Order: Chiroptera
- Family: Pteropodidae
- Genus: Dobsonia
- Species: D. moluccensis

Binomial name
- Dobsonia moluccensis (Quoy & Gaimard, 1830)
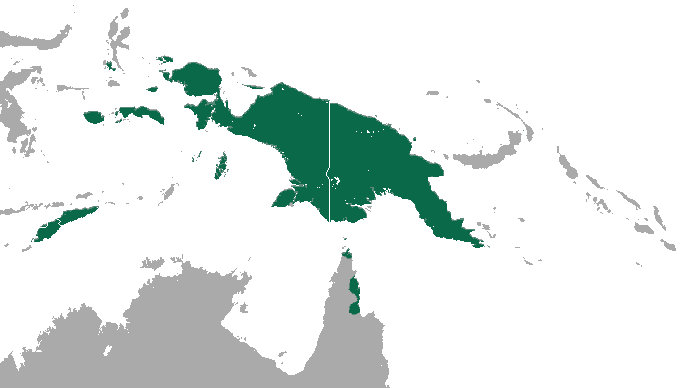
- Bare-backed fruit bat range

Synonyms
- Hypoderma moluccensis Quoy & Gaimard, 1830; Cephalotes peronii É. Geoffroy, 1810

= Bare-backed fruit bat =

Species of bat

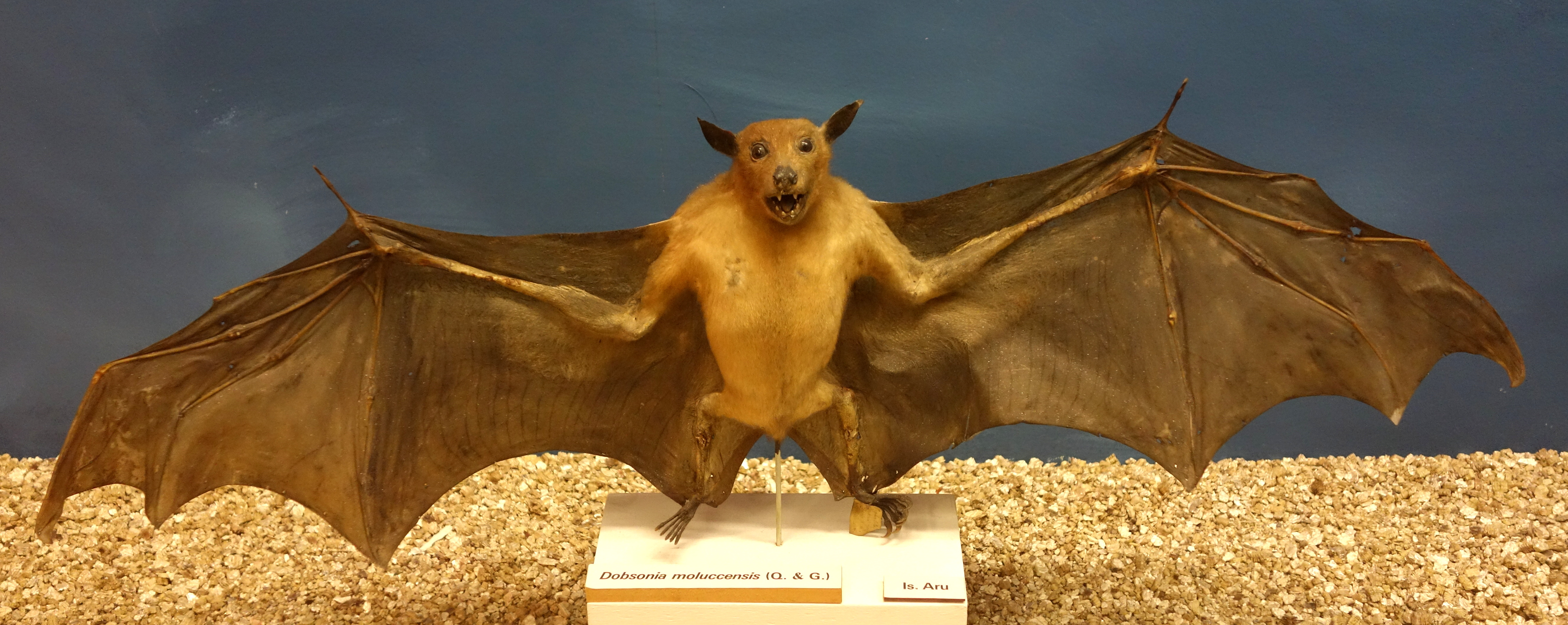
Dobsonia moluccensis taxidermied specimen at the Museo Civico di Storia Naturale di Genova in Genoa, Italy

The bare-backed fruit bat or Moluccan naked-backed fruit bat (Dobsonia moluccensis) is a fruit bat in the family Pteropodidae.

== Taxonomy and etymology ==
It was described as a new species in 1830 by Jean René Constant Quoy and Joseph Paul Gaimard who placed it in the now-defunct bat genus Hypoderma, with the scientific name H. moluccensis. Its relationship with Dobsonia magna requires further investigation. Its species name "moluccensis" means "belonging to the Moluccas," which is where the species is found.

== Description ==
Its fur is brown and its feet have distinctive white claws. It is smaller than the New Guinea naked-backed fruit bat. Males weigh 380–500 g (0.84–1.10 lb) while females weigh 325–525 g (0.717–1.157 lb). Its ears are pointed, and its second digits lack claws, unlike flying foxes. Its wings attach at the back along the spine rather than along the sides of the body.

== Biology and ecology ==
The bare-backed fruit bat is a seasonal breeder, with the mating season from April to June. Females give birth from mid-August through November. It is found in Indonesia, East Timor, Papua New Guinea, and Australia. It has been documented from 0–2,700 m (0–8,858 ft) above sea level.

As of 2016, it is considered a least-concern species by the IUCN.
