= Cyrtodactylus zugii =

Cyrtodactylus zugi

Conservation status
- Least Concern (IUCN 3.1)

Scientific classification
- Kingdom: Animalia
- Phylum: Chordata
- Class: Reptilia
- Order: Squamata
- Suborder: Gekkota
- Family: Gekkonidae
- Genus: Cyrtodactylus
- Species: C. zugi

Binomial name
- Cyrtodactylus zugi P. Oliver, Tjaturadi, Mumpuni, Krey & Richards, 2008
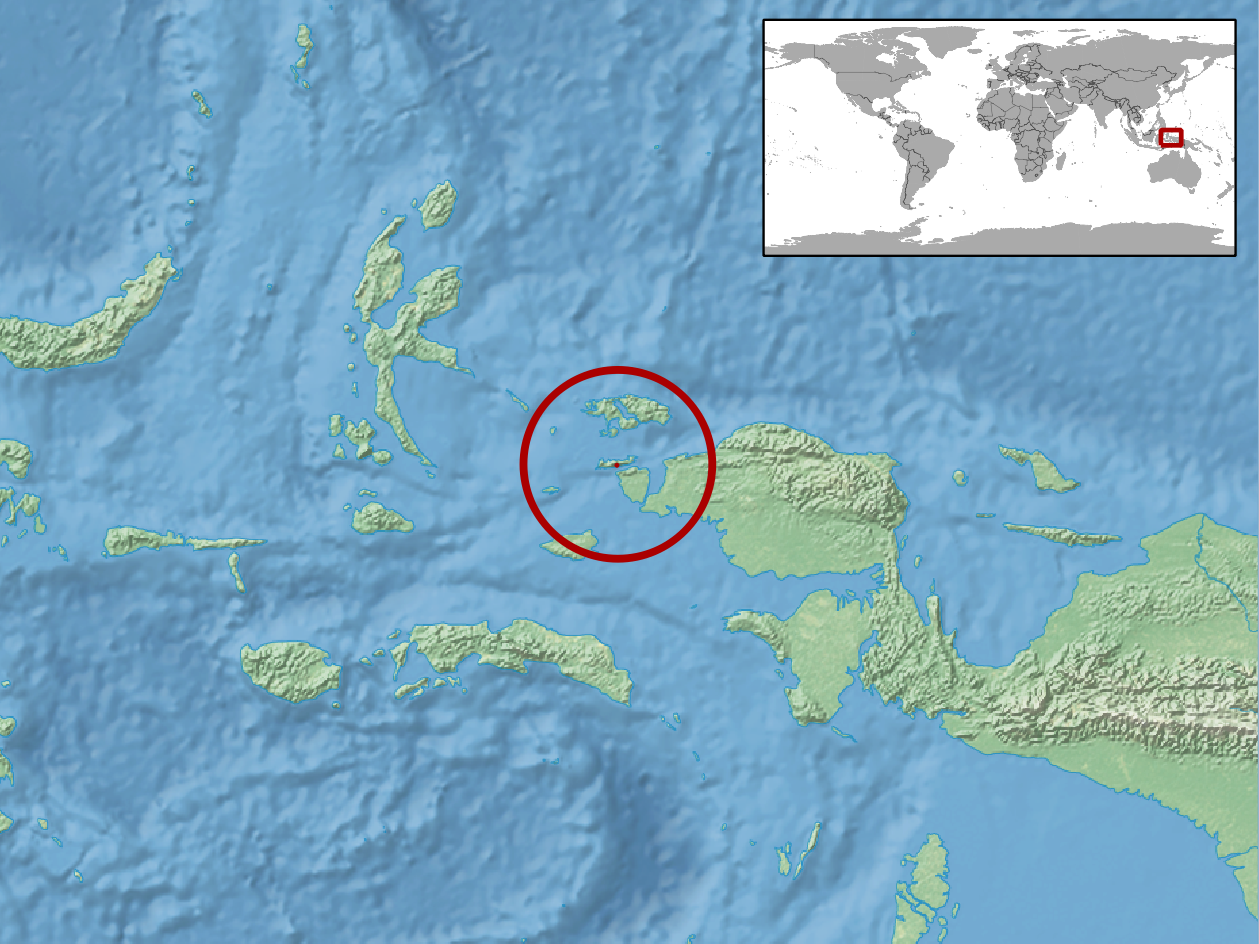

Species of lizard

Cyrtodactylus zugi is a species of gecko, a lizard in the family Gekkonidae. The species is endemic to Batanta and Waigeo Islands in Indonesia.

== Etymology ==
The specific name, zugi, is in honor of American herpetologist George R. Zug.

== Habitat ==
The preferred natural habitat of C. zugi is forest.

== Description ==
Very large and robust for its genus, C. zugi may attain a snout-to-vent length (SVL) of almost 16 cm (6.3 in).

== Reproduction ==
C. zugi is oviparous.
