= Andersen's naked-backed fruit bat =

Conservation status
- Least Concern (IUCN 3.1)

Scientific classification
- Kingdom: Animalia
- Phylum: Chordata
- Class: Mammalia
- Order: Chiroptera
- Family: Pteropodidae
- Genus: Dobsonia
- Species: D. anderseni

Binomial name
- Dobsonia anderseni Thomas, 1914
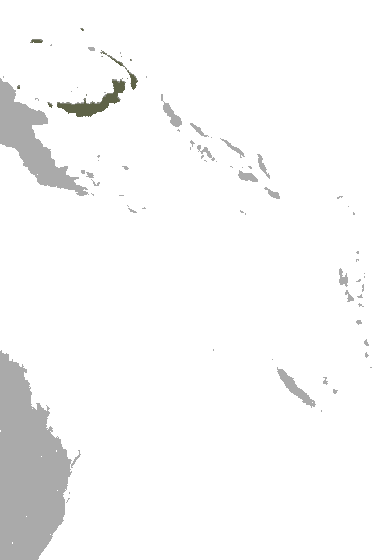
- Andersen's naked-backed fruit bat range

Species of bat

Andersen's naked-backed fruit bat or Andersen's bare-backed fruit bat (Dobsonia anderseni) is a large cave-dwelling species of megabat in the family Pteropodidae. It is endemic to the Bismarck Archipelago including the Admiralty Islands in Papua New Guinea.

== Taxonomy and etymology ==
It was described as a new species in 1914 by British zoologist Oldfield Thomas. The holotype used to describe the species was collected by Albert Stewart Meek and his brother-in-law, Albert Frederic Eichhorn, in October 1913. The eponym for the species name "anderseni" is Danish mammalogist Knud Andersen. Of Andersen, Thomas wrote: "I have named the species in honour of Dr. K. Andersen, in recognition of the striking monograph of Dobsonia contained in his Catalogue, a monograph which has entirely revolutionized our knowledge of the group."

== Description ==
Its forearm length is 123–125 mm (4.8–4.9 in). Its fur is very dark brown, with its head nearly black.

== Range and habitat ==
Its range includes several islands of Papua New Guinea. It has been documented at elevations up to 1,500 m (4,900 ft) above sea level.

== Conservation ==
As of 2020, it is listed as a least-concern species by the IUCN. Threats to this species include overharvesting for bushmeat or disturbance of the caves where it roosts during the day.
