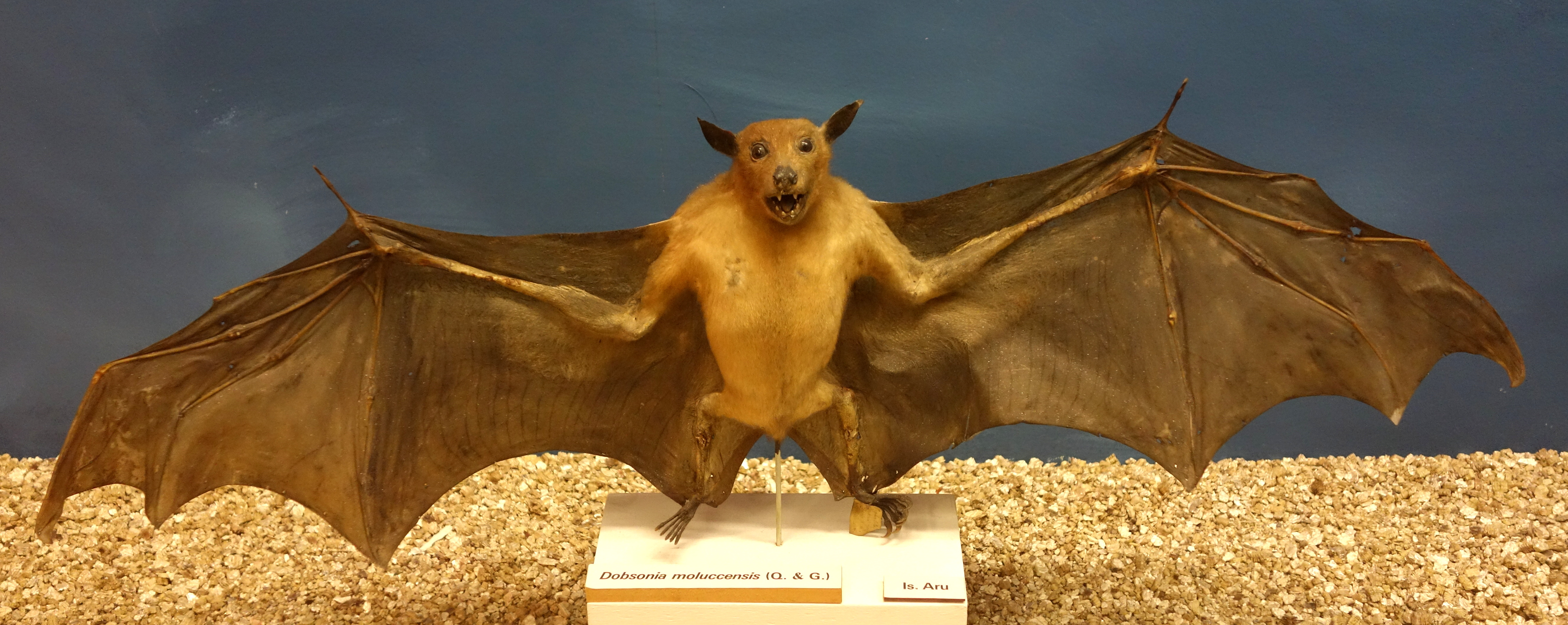
- Moluccan naked-backed fruit bat (Dobsonia moluccensis)

Scientific classification
- Kingdom: Animalia
- Phylum: Chordata
- Class: Mammalia
- Order: Chiroptera
- Family: Pteropodidae
- Genus: Dobsonia; Palmer, 1898

Type species
- Cephalotes peroni Geoffroy, 1810

Species
- See text

= Dobsonia =

Genus of bats

Dobsonia is a genus of megabat in the family Pteropodidae. It contains the following 14 species:

- Andersen's naked-backed fruit bat, Dobsonia anderseni
- Beaufort's naked-backed fruit bat, Dobsonia beauforti
- Philippine bare-backed fruit bat, Dobsonia chapmani
- Halmahera naked-backed fruit bat, Dobsonia crenulata
- Biak naked-backed fruit bat, Dobsonia emersa
- Sulawesi naked-backed fruit bat, Dobsonia exoleta
- Solomon's naked-backed fruit bat, Dobsonia inermis
- New Guinea naked-backed fruit bat, Dobsonia magna
- Lesser naked-backed fruit bat, Dobsonia minor
- Moluccan naked-backed fruit bat, Dobsonia moluccensis
- Panniet naked-backed fruit bat, Dobsonia pannietensis (including subspecies D. pannietensis remota which is sometimes referred to as D. remota)
- Western naked-backed fruit bat, Dobsonia peroni
- New Britain naked-backed fruit bat, Dobsonia praedatrix
- Greenish naked-backed fruit bat, Dobsonia viridis
