= Solomon's naked-backed fruit bat =

Conservation status
- Least Concern (IUCN 3.1)

Scientific classification
- Kingdom: Animalia
- Phylum: Chordata
- Class: Mammalia
- Order: Chiroptera
- Family: Pteropodidae
- Genus: Dobsonia
- Species: D. inermis

Binomial name
- Dobsonia inermis K. Andersen, 1909
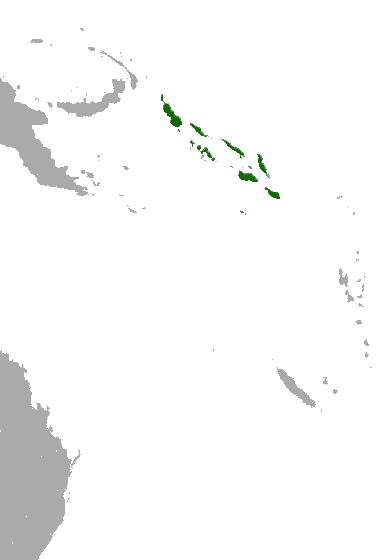
- Solomon's naked-backed fruit bat range

Species of bat

The Solomon's naked-backed fruit bat (Dobsonia inermis) is a species of megabat in the family Pteropodidae. It is endemic to the Solomon Islands.
