= Sulawesi naked-backed fruit bat =

Conservation status
- Least Concern (IUCN 3.1)

Scientific classification
- Kingdom: Animalia
- Phylum: Chordata
- Class: Mammalia
- Order: Chiroptera
- Family: Pteropodidae
- Genus: Dobsonia
- Species: D. exoleta

Binomial name
- Dobsonia exoleta K. Andersen, 1909
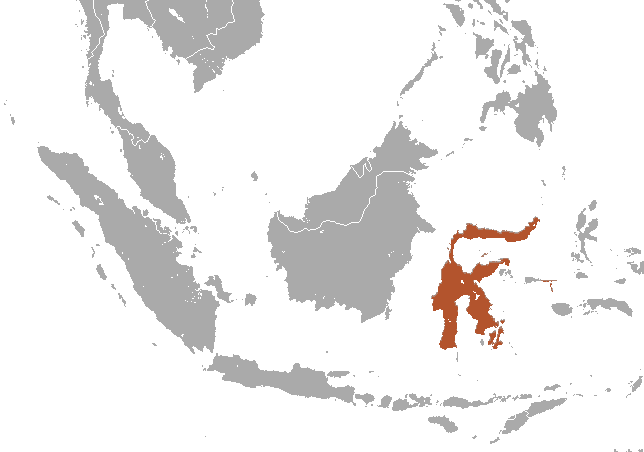
- Sulawesi naked-backed fruit bat range

Species of bat

The Sulawesi naked-backed fruit bat (Dobsonia exoleta) is a species of megabat in the family Pteropodidae. It is endemic to Indonesia.
