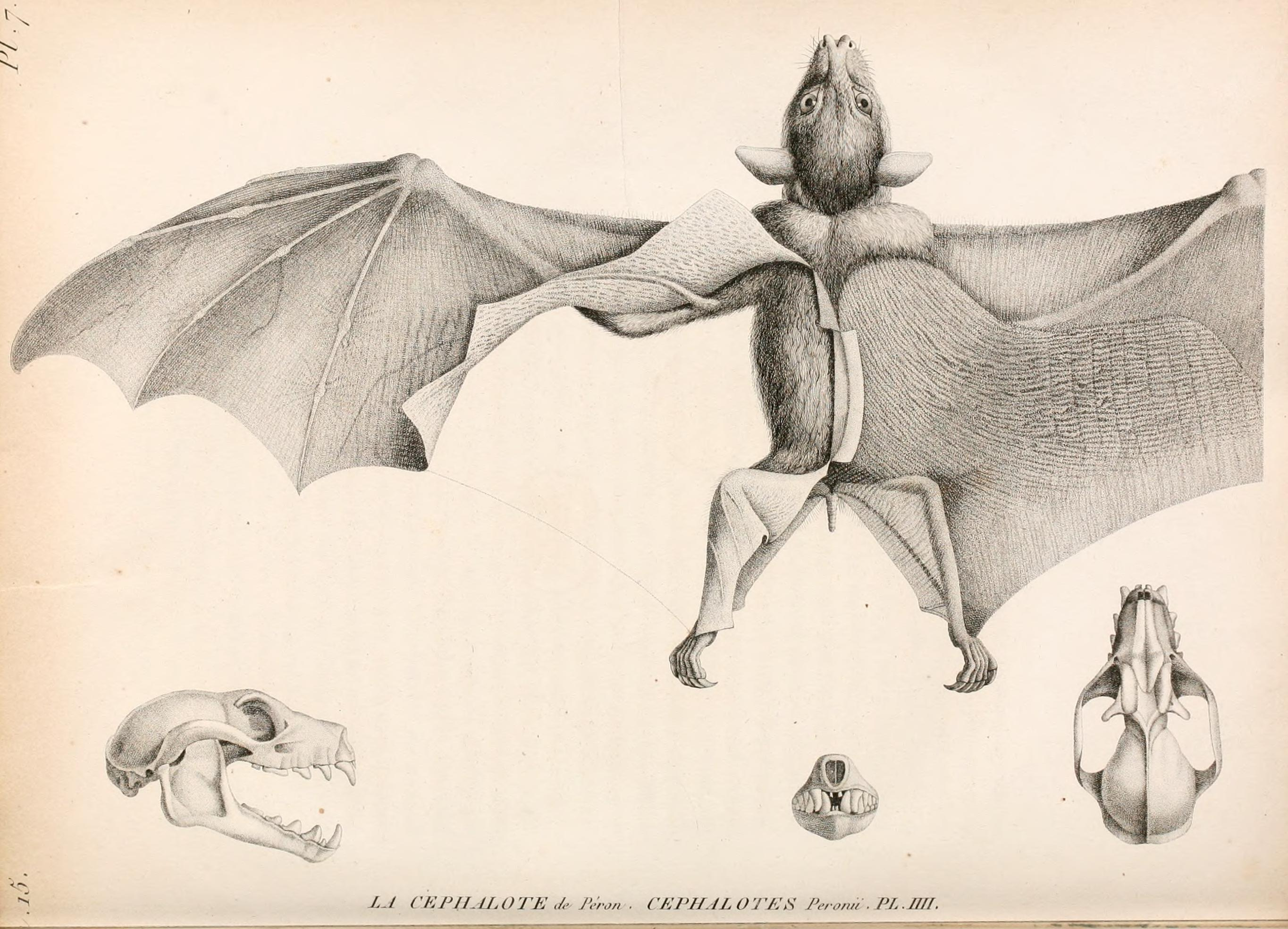

Conservation status
- Least Concern (IUCN 3.1)

Scientific classification
- Kingdom: Animalia
- Phylum: Chordata
- Class: Mammalia
- Order: Chiroptera
- Family: Pteropodidae
- Genus: Dobsonia
- Species: D. peronii

Binomial name
- Dobsonia peronii (É. Geoffroy, 1810)
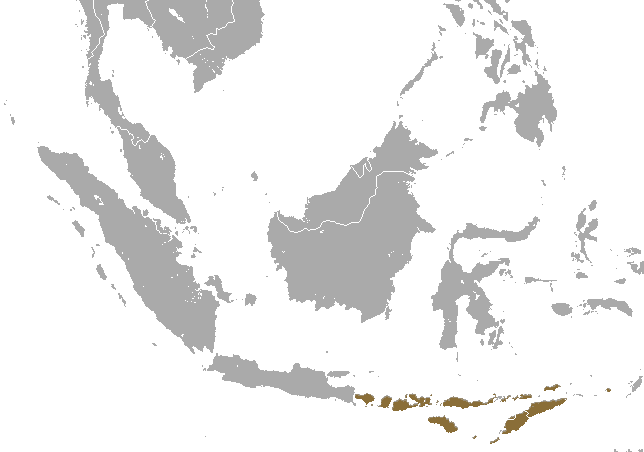
- Western naked-backed fruit bat range

= Western naked-backed fruit bat =

Species of bat

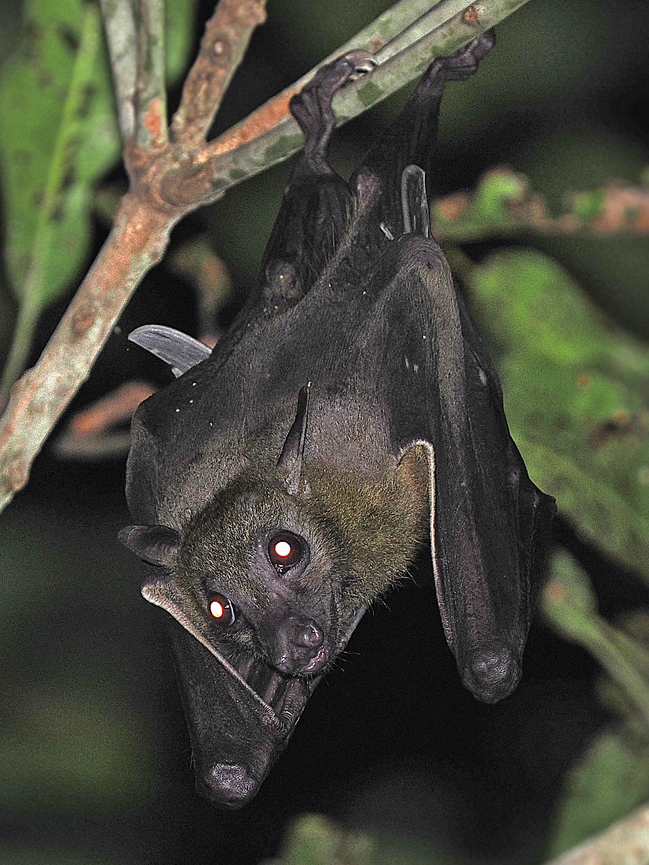
A western naked-backed fruit bat

The western naked-backed fruit bat (Dobsonia peronii) is a species of megabat in the family Pteropodidae. It is endemic to Indonesia and Timor-Leste. Its natural habitat is subtropical or tropical dry forests.
