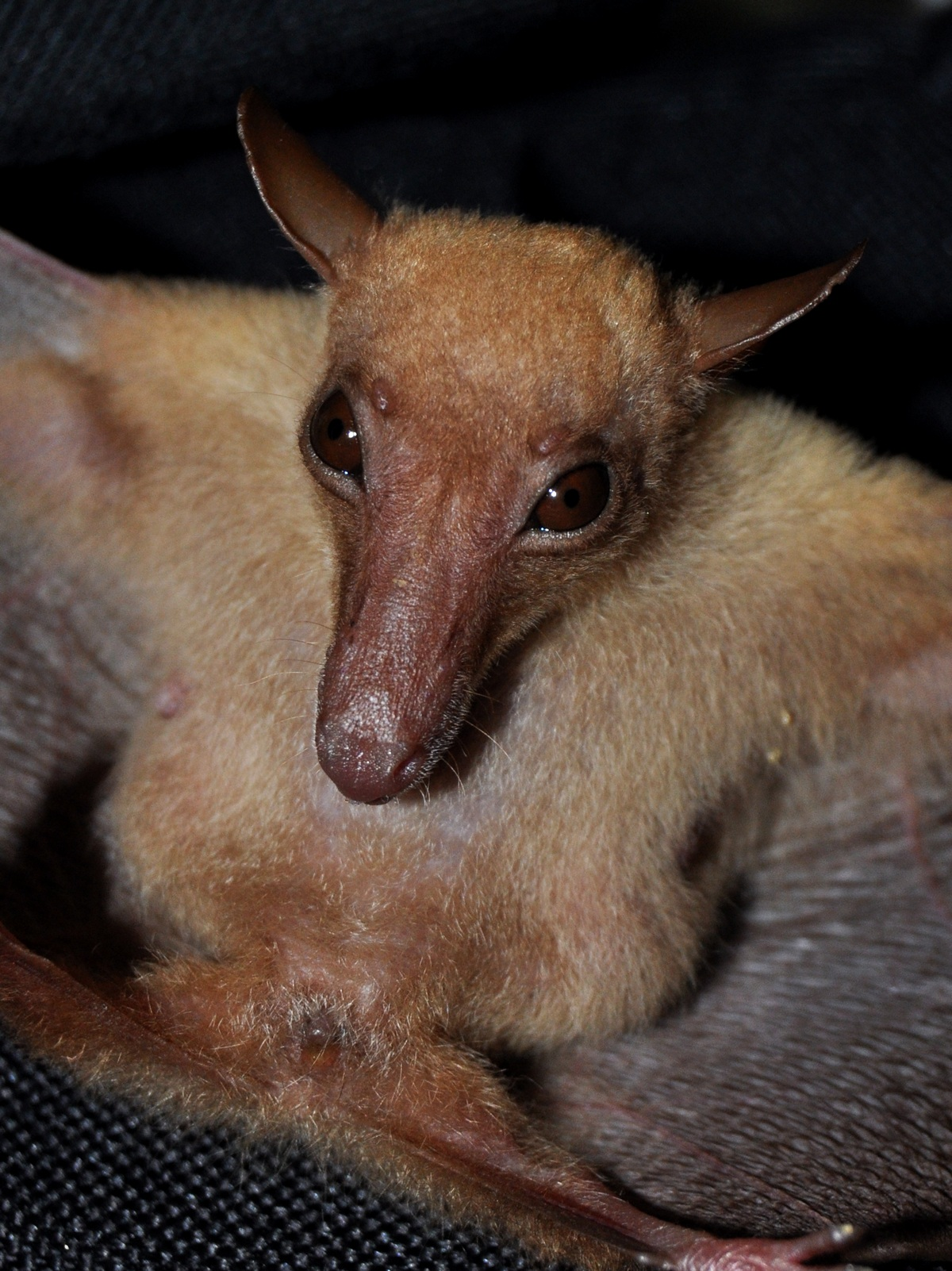

Conservation status
- Least Concern (IUCN 3.1)

Scientific classification
- Kingdom: Animalia
- Phylum: Chordata
- Class: Mammalia
- Order: Chiroptera
- Family: Pteropodidae
- Subfamily: Macroglossinae
- Genus: Macroglossus
- Species: M. sobrinus

Binomial name
- Macroglossus sobrinus K. Andersen, 1911
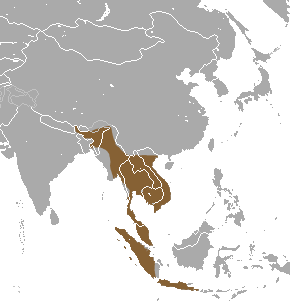
- Long-tongued fruit bat range

Synonyms
- Macroglossus minimus sobrinus K. Andersen, 1911

= Long-tongued fruit bat =

Species of bat

The long-tongued fruit bat (Macroglossus sobrinus) is a species of megabat. It is nectarivorous, feeding on nectar from primarily banana flowers. It is found in several countries in South and Southeast Asia.

== Taxonomy and etymology ==
It was described as a new subspecies in 1911 by Danish mammalogist Knud Andersen. Andersen described it as a subspecies of the long-tongued nectar bat, with the trinomen Macroglossus minimus sobrinus. Beginning in approximately 1983, it has been considered a full species rather than a subspecies. Its species name "sobrinus" means "cousin;" Andersen possibly chose this name to reflect what he believed was its close relationship to M. minimus minimus.

== Description ==
Andersen noted that it differed from the long-tongued nectar bat in several ways. Overall, it is a larger species with a longer snout. Its forearm is 42–48.5 mm (1.65–1.91 in) long and individuals weigh 18–26 g (0.63–0.92 oz).

== Biology and ecology ==
The long-tongued fruit bat feeds on nectar almost exclusively from banana flowers. It is nocturnal, foraging at night and roosting during the day in trees. It roosts singly or in small, "well-spaced parties."

== Range and habitat ==
Unlike the long-tongued nectar bat, which is considered a coastal species, the long-tongued fruit bat is considered an inland species. Its range includes several countries in Asia, including Cambodia, China, India, Indonesia, Laos, Malaysia, Myanmar, Thailand, and Vietnam.

== Conservation ==
It is currently assessed as least concern by the IUCN—its lowest conservation priority.
