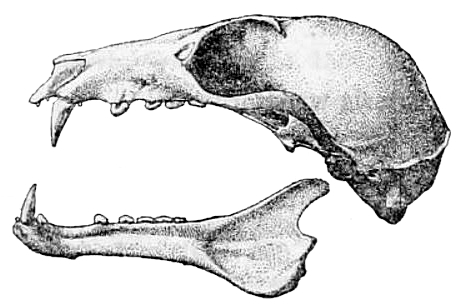

Conservation status
- Least Concern (IUCN 3.1)

Scientific classification
- Kingdom: Animalia
- Phylum: Chordata
- Class: Mammalia
- Order: Chiroptera
- Family: Pteropodidae
- Genus: Melonycteris
- Species: M. woodfordi

Binomial name
- Melonycteris woodfordi (Thomas, 1887)
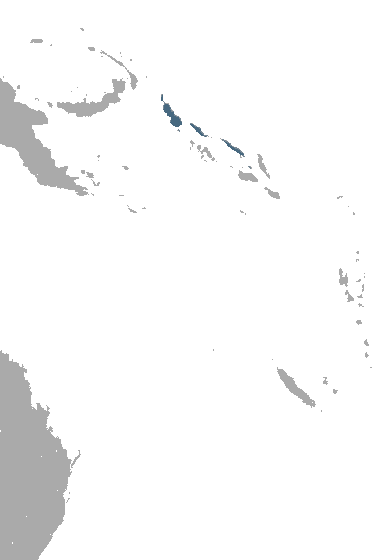
- Woodford's fruit bat range

= Woodford's fruit bat =

Species of bat

Woodford's fruit bat (Melonycteris woodfordi), also known as the orange fruit bat, is a species of megabat in the family Pteropodidae. It is endemic to the Solomon Islands.
