= Halmahera blossom bat =

Conservation status
- Near Threatened (IUCN 3.1)

Scientific classification
- Kingdom: Animalia
- Phylum: Chordata
- Class: Mammalia
- Order: Chiroptera
- Family: Pteropodidae
- Genus: Syconycteris
- Species: S. carolinae

Binomial name
- Syconycteris carolinae Rozendaal, 1984
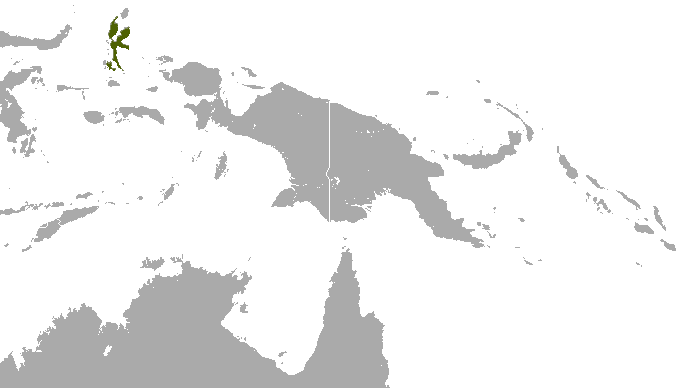
- Halmahera blossom bat range

Species of bat

The Halmahera blossom bat (Syconycteris carolinae) is a species of megabat in the family Pteropodidae. It is endemic to Halmahera and Bacan islands, of the northern Maluku Islands archipelago in Indonesia.

It is an IUCN Red List Near Threatened species. A 2017 study ranked the species as the 8th highest research priority among island endemic bats based on conservation situation and current data availability.
