= Moss-forest blossom bat =

Conservation status
- Least Concern (IUCN 3.1)

Scientific classification
- Kingdom: Animalia
- Phylum: Chordata
- Class: Mammalia
- Order: Chiroptera
- Family: Pteropodidae
- Genus: Syconycteris
- Species: S. hobbit

Binomial name
- Syconycteris hobbit Ziegler, 1982
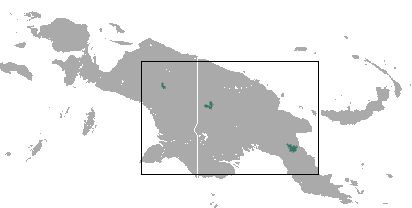
- Moss-forest blossom bat range

Species of bat

The moss-forest blossom bat (Syconycteris hobbit) is a species of megabat in the family Pteropodidae found in New Guinea. Its natural habitat is subtropical and tropical dry forests.

Originally discovered in New Guinea 1911, the moss-forest blossom bat was later discovered in Habema, Tembagapura-Timika, and Lian Jaya, and Indonesia in 1982 by Ziegler. Ziegler described Hobbit on the basis of an adult and subadult gathered from Marobe Province, Papua New Guinea 7'31'' S 146'40' E at an elevation of 2400 m above sea level. In 1990 another was found from high altitude of Forfes near the summit of Mt Kaindi, Marobe Province.

The Moss-forest blossom bat is characterized by dark greyish-brown fur dorsally, darkest on its head and nape, with a paler anterior back laterally and a much paler posterior. Irian Jayan bats have dense velvet fur all over their dorsum, but less on venter, being shortest on the front and sides of the head. They possess rusty brown forearms and flanks down to the hind legs. In many cases, the rump is fainty, light brown, with a whitish suffusion on the medio-ventral parts of the body. Tembagapura-Timika bats are lighter than their relatives in the Habema Highlands.

Tambagapura Timika bats average 18 grams (0.63 oz). The average weight of Irian Jayan is considerably heavier than the New Guinea variant, where adults average 15.7 grams (0.55 oz). Irian Jaya bats have slightly larger skulls and teeth.
