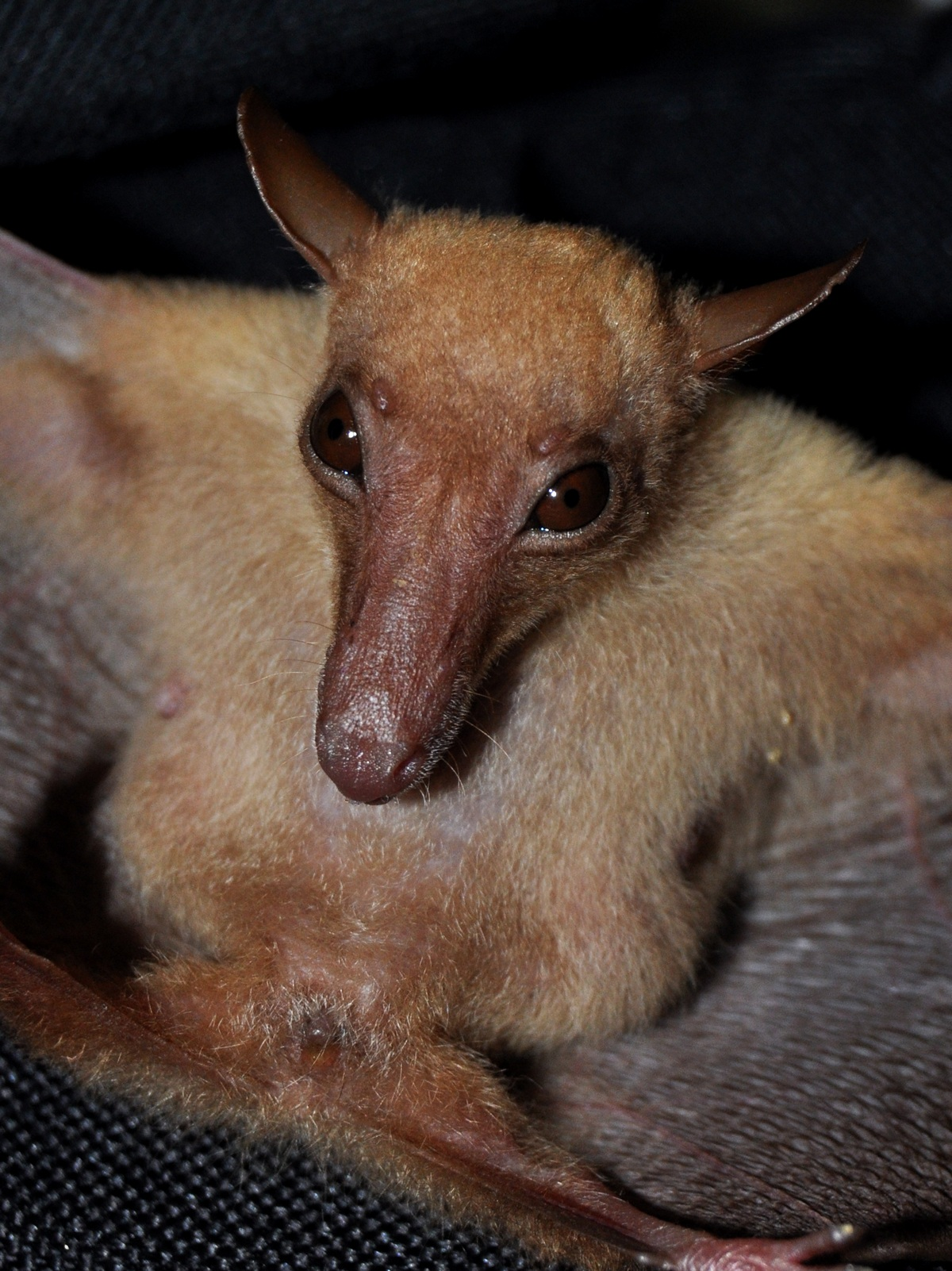
- Long-tongued fruit bat (Macroglossus sobrinus)

Scientific classification
- Domain: Eukaryota
- Kingdom: Animalia
- Phylum: Chordata
- Class: Mammalia
- Order: Chiroptera
- Family: Pteropodidae
- Subfamily: Macroglossinae
- Genus: Macroglossus; F. Cuvier, 1824

Type species
- Pteropus minimus Geoffroy, 1810

Species
- See text

= Macroglossus =

Genus of bats

Macroglossus (nectar bat) is a genus of megabats (family Pteropodidae) found in Indonesia and Southeast Asia. It has two species:

- Long-tongued nectar bat, Macroglossus minimus
- Long-tongued fruit bat, Macroglossus sobrinus
