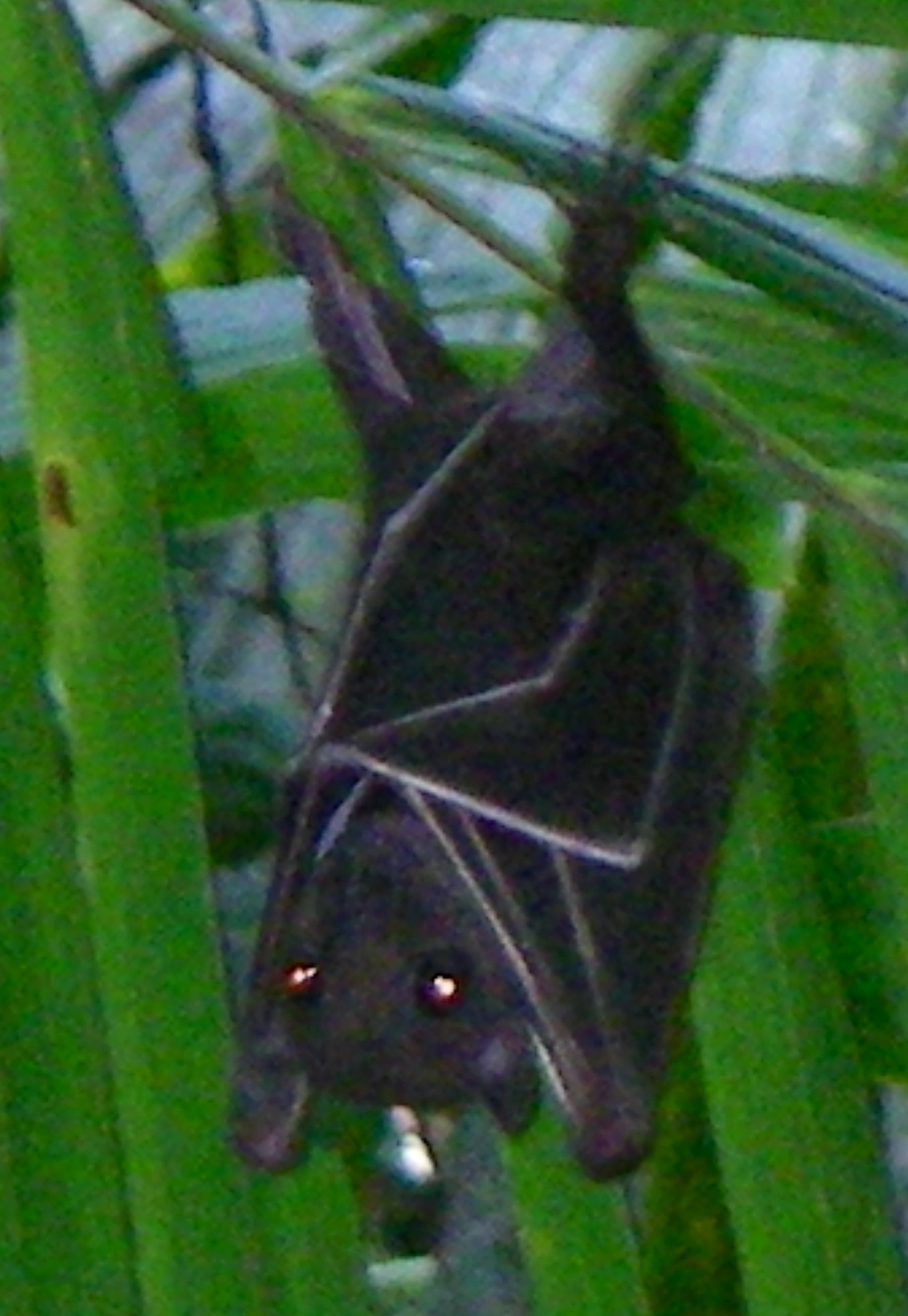

Conservation status
- Least Concern (IUCN 3.1)

Scientific classification
- Kingdom: Animalia
- Phylum: Chordata
- Class: Mammalia
- Order: Chiroptera
- Family: Pteropodidae
- Genus: Dobsonia
- Species: D. minor

Binomial name
- Dobsonia minor Dobson, 1879
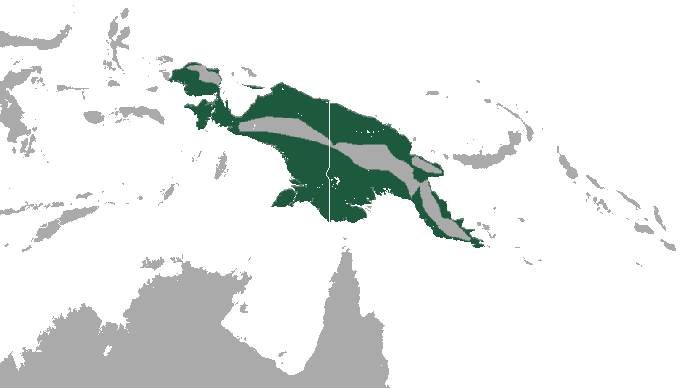
- Lesser naked-backed fruit bat range

= Lesser naked-backed fruit bat =

Species of bat

The lesser naked-backed fruit bat (Dobsonia minor) is a species of megabat in the family Pteropodidae. It is found in Indonesia and Papua New Guinea.
