= New Guinea naked-backed fruit bat =

Conservation status
- Least Concern (IUCN 3.1)

Scientific classification
- Kingdom: Animalia
- Phylum: Chordata
- Class: Mammalia
- Order: Chiroptera
- Family: Pteropodidae
- Genus: Dobsonia
- Species: D. magna

Binomial name
- Dobsonia magna Thomas, 1905

Synonyms
- Dobsonia moluccensis magna

Species of mammal

The New Guinea naked-backed fruit bat (Dobsonia magna or Dobsonia moluccensis magna) is a species of megabat native to Papua New Guinea and the Indonesian islands of Waigeo, Yapen, Batanta, and Misool.
