= Greenish naked-backed fruit bat =

Conservation status
- Least Concern (IUCN 3.1)

Scientific classification
- Kingdom: Animalia
- Phylum: Chordata
- Class: Mammalia
- Order: Chiroptera
- Family: Pteropodidae
- Genus: Dobsonia
- Species: D. viridis

Binomial name
- Dobsonia viridis Heude, 1896
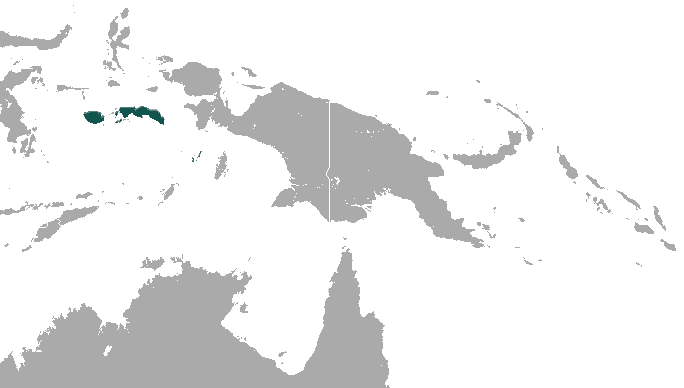
- Greenish naked-backed fruit bat range

Species of bat

The greenish naked-backed fruit bat (Dobsonia viridis) is a species of megabat in the family Pteropodidae. It is endemic to some of the northeastern Lesser Sunda Islands in Indonesia, being found on the Kai Islands, the Banda Islands, and the central and southern Molucca Islands, including Seram Island, Ambon Island, and Buru Island.

== See also ==
- Bats of Indonesia
- Endemic fauna of Indonesia
