= Fardoulis's blossom bat =

Conservation status
- Near Threatened (IUCN 3.1)

Scientific classification
- Kingdom: Animalia
- Phylum: Chordata
- Class: Mammalia
- Order: Chiroptera
- Family: Pteropodidae
- Genus: Melonycteris
- Species: M. fardoulisi

Binomial name
- Melonycteris fardoulisi Flannery, 1993
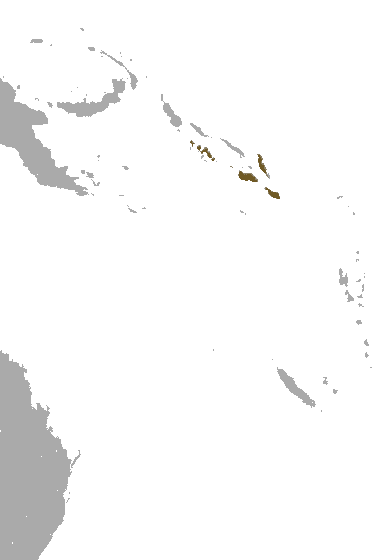
- Fardoulis's blossom bat range

Species of bat

Fardoulis's blossom bat (Melonycteris fardoulisi) is a species of bat in the Pteropodidae family. It is endemic to the Solomon Islands. Its natural habitat is subtropical or tropical moist lowland forests. It is named after Emmanuel Fardoulis.
