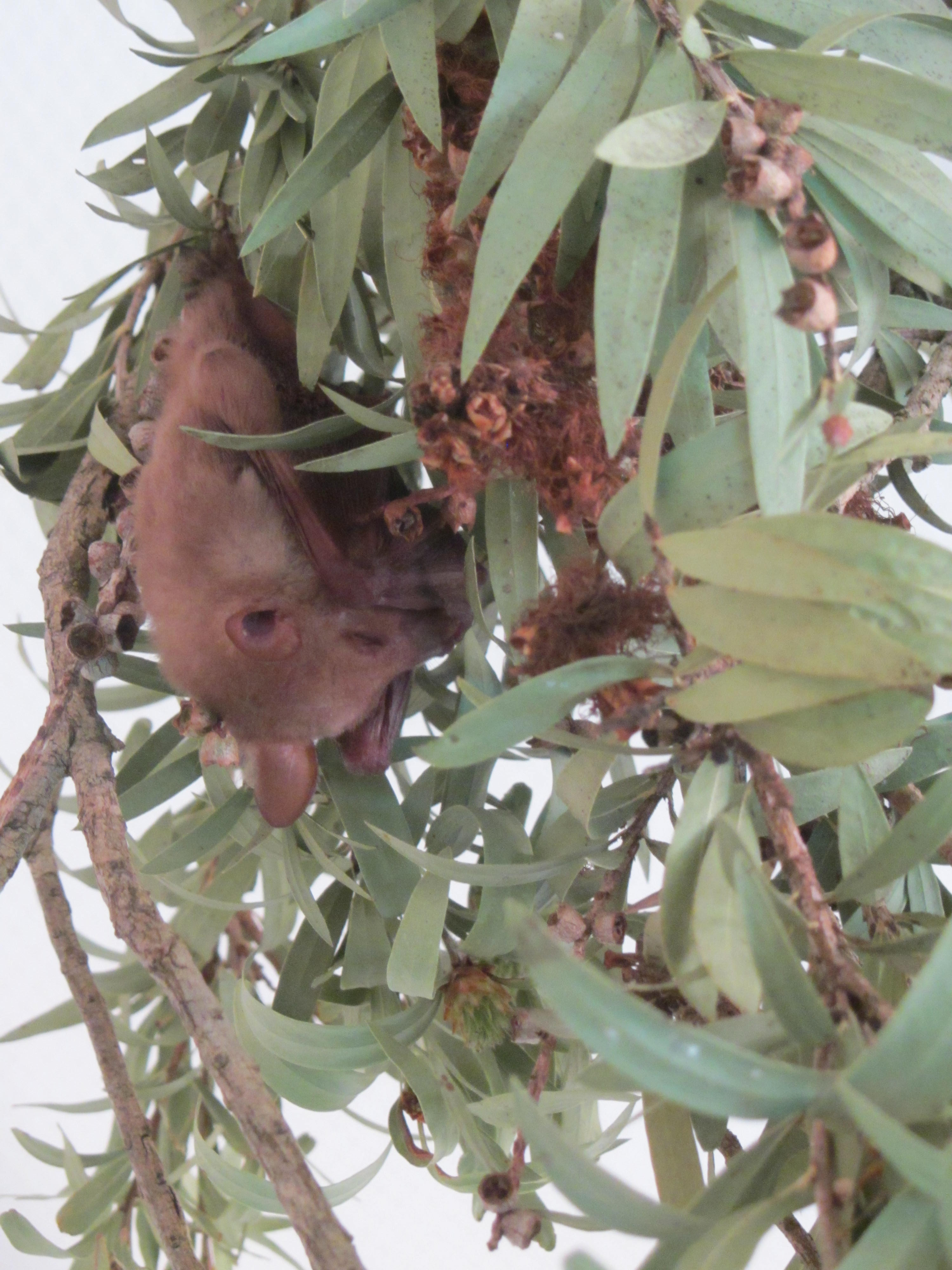

Conservation status
- Least Concern (IUCN 3.1)

Scientific classification
- Kingdom: Animalia
- Phylum: Chordata
- Class: Mammalia
- Order: Chiroptera
- Family: Pteropodidae
- Genus: Syconycteris
- Species: S. australis

Binomial name
- Syconycteris australis (Peters, 1867)
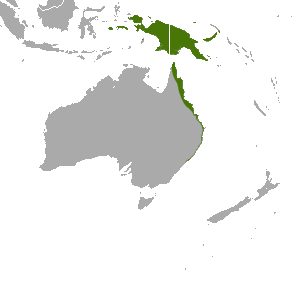
- Common blossom bat range

= Common blossom bat =

Species of bat

The common blossom bat (Syconycteris australis) also known as the southern blossom bat or Queensland blossom bat, is a megabat in the family Pteropodidae. The common blossom bat feeds mostly on nectar and pollen rather than fruit. It is one of eight Pteropodidae species on mainland Australia. It is one of the smallest of all nectarivorous megabats.

== Description ==
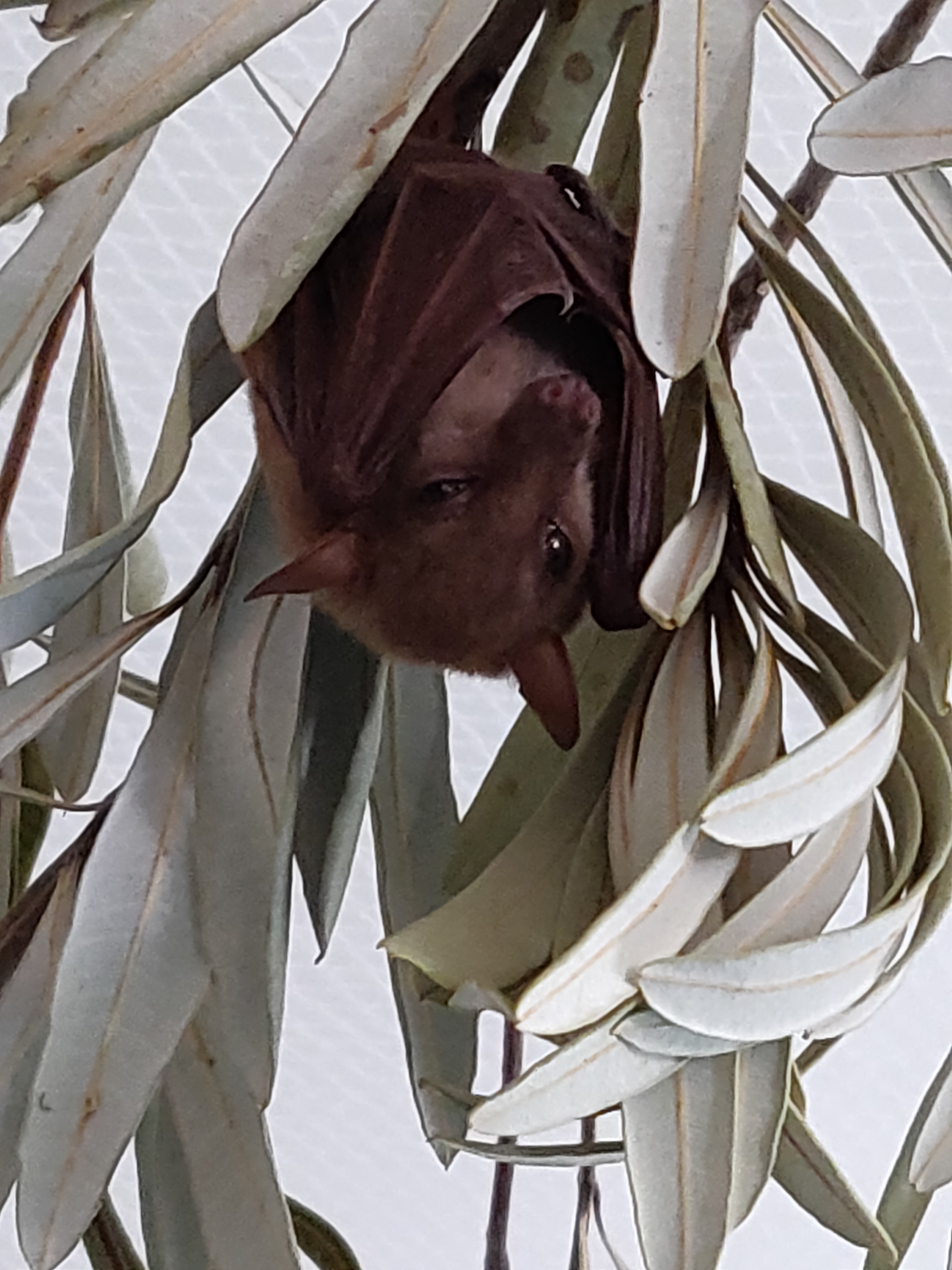

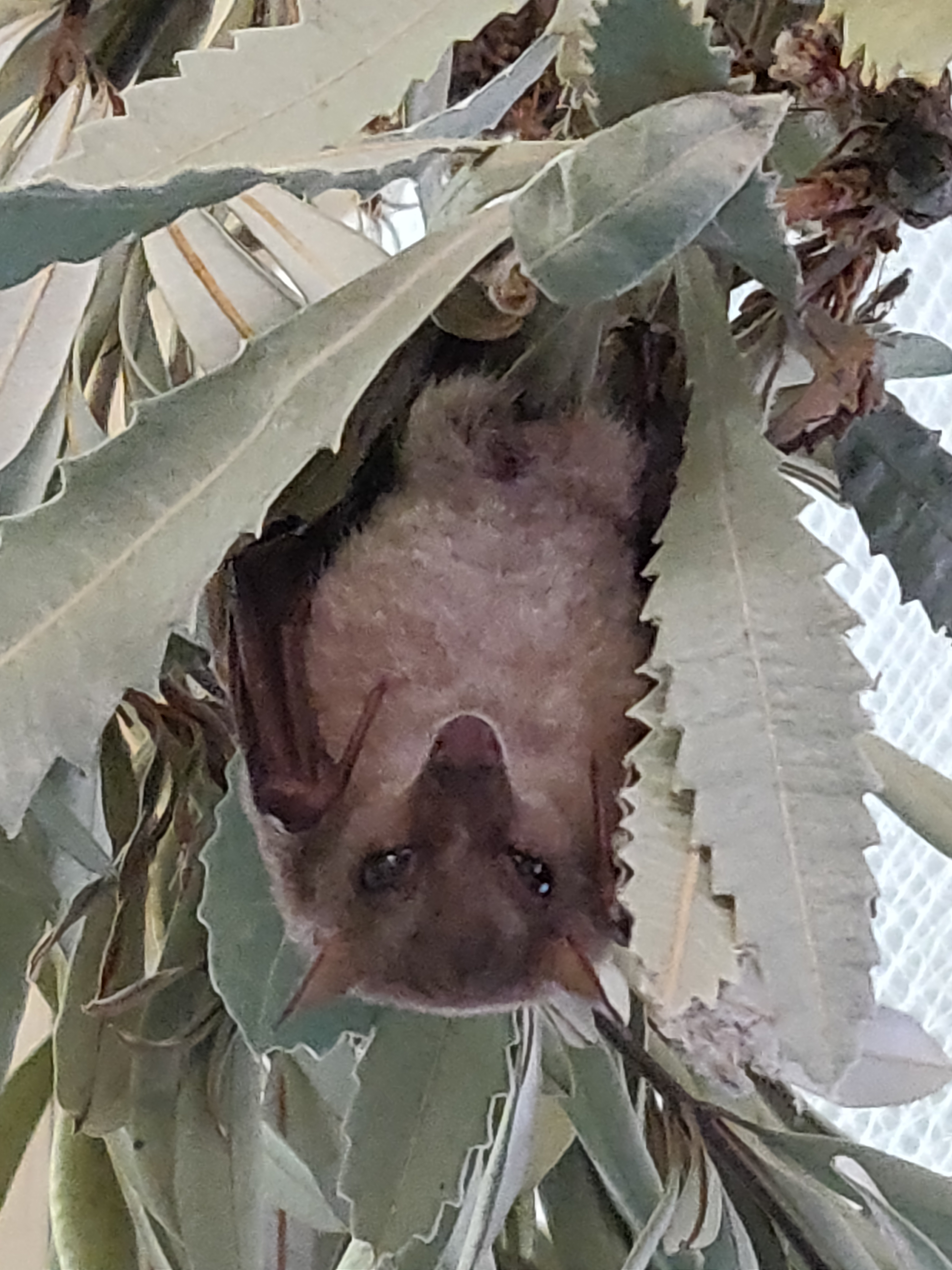

They are small, weighing only 17.5–21 g (0.62–0.74 oz). Body length excluding legs is around 60 mm (2.4 in) long.

== Distribution and habitat ==
They are found in the Maluku Islands, Salawati, Biak, Yapen, New Guinea, the Aru Islands, the Bismarck Archipelago, Manus Island, the D'Entrecasteaux Islands, the Louisiade Archipelago, New South Wales, Australia, and eastern Queensland, Australia. They range from 0–3,000 m (0–9,843 ft) above sea level. They are found in upland tropical rainforests and the Littoral Rainforests of New South Wales.

== Behaviour ==
They roost singly or in small groups, which makes estimating population based on visual observation difficult. They generally roost in the rainforest subcanopy. They may change roosts daily however (when food was available) distances between subsequent roosts in NSW were short (average 42m at Iluka or 125m at Harrington). They are probably important pollinators, as they carry six times as much pollen as birds while also traveling further in a night. The bumpy satinash tree is an important food source for this species in North Queensland, as 95% of all pollen observed on their fur comes from this species on bats caught near flowering trees. Their home ranges are 12–1,796 ha (0.046–6.934 sq mi). When foraging, they prefer to fly along riparian zones.

Because their energy demands are high and the energy content of a single flower is low, they must visit the equivalent of 36-48 coast banksia flowers every night. To meet their energy requirements, they are active for a large proportion of the night. During the full moon, they will delay their departure from their roosts. This suggests that they are afraid of predators such as owls that hunt by sight. Other potential predators include goannas and arboreal snakes. Domestic cats are known to capture and injure them. They will enter torpor when food availability is low, or when the ambient temperature is below 26 °C (79 °F). Contrary to other bat species, torpor is more common and pronounced in the summer than in the winter.
