= List of bats of Borneo =

This is a list of the bats of Borneo.

== Bats of Sarawak ==
- Rousettus amplexicaudatus: Baram, Niah
- Rousettus spinalatus: Niah, Bintulu, Lambir NP, Simulajau NP
- Pteropus vampyrus: coastal, interior
- Pteropus hypomelanus: off coast island
- Cynopterus brachyotis: lowland to 1600m
- Cynopterus sphinx: not recorded in Sarawak
- Cynopterus horsfieldi: Gading NP, Lundu, Kubah NP
- Penthetor lucasi: Wind Cave, Kubah NP, Gading NP, Samunsam WS, Tg Datu NP, Balui, Mulu NP, Bako NP
- Megaerops ecaudatus: Kelabit, Penrisen Height
- Ptenochirus wetmorei: not recorded in Sarawak
- Dycopterus spadiceus: Pueh foot, Kubah NP, Baram, Niah, Sibu
- Chironax melanocephalus: recently recorded in Kubah NP, Samunsam, Lambir NP, Loagan Bunut NP
- Balionycteris maculata: Kuching, Kubah NP, Gading, Padawan, Mulu, Niah, Dulit, Bario, Lambir.
- Aethalops alecto: Mulu NP, Kelabit, Murud, Penrisen Height
- Eonycteris spelaea: Kubah NP, Gading, Kuching, Niah, Tinjar
- Eonycteris major: Kuching, Dulit, Penrisen Height
- Macroglossus minimus: Bako NP, Kelabit, Niah NP
- Cheiromeles torquatus: Niah NP

== Bats of Sabah ==
- Rousettus amplexicaudatus: Balembangan, Sukau, Madai, Tawau
- Rousettus spinalatus: Sukau, Kuamut
- Pteropus vampyrus: coastal
- Pteropus hypomelanus: off coast island
- Cynopterus brachyotis : lowland to 1600m
- Cynopterus sphinx: no record
- Cynopterus horsfieldi: Kinabalu, Gomantong
- Penthetor lucasi: Gomantong, Kuamut, Sapulut
- Megaerops ecaudatus: Danum, Tawau, Tenom
- Megaerops wetmorei: no record
- Dycopterus spadiceus: Sepilok, Baturong Cave
- Chironax melanocephalus: Sepilok
- Balionycteris maculata: Poring, Kota Kinabalu, Madai, Tawau, Poring
- Aethalops alecto: Kinabalu, Crocker
- Eonycteris spelaea: Gomantong, Sukau, Segama, Madai
- Eonycteris major: Kota Kinabalu, Ranau
- Macroglossus minimus: Kota Kinabalu, Witti Range, Sepilok, Sukau, Tawau, Poring

== Bats of Brunei ==
- Rousettus amplexicaudatus: unknown localities
- Rousettus spinalatus: not recorded
- Pteropus vampyrus: lowland areas
- Pteropus hypomelanus: no record
- Cynopterus brachyotis : lowland to 1600m
- Cynopterus sphinx: no record
- Cynopterus horsfieldi: no record
- Penthetor lucasi: lowland
- Megaerops ecaudatus: unknown localities
- Megaerops wetmorei: Andulau, Benutan Dam-site, Sungai Beruang, Tasek Merimbun and Ulu Temburung.
- Dycopterus spadiceus: unknown localities
- Chironax melanocephalus: Ulu Temburong
- Balionycteris maculata: unknown localities
- Aethalops alecto: upland areas
- Eonycteris spelaea: unknown localities
- Eonycteris major: no record
- Macroglossus minimus: most areas
