= Elaeocarpus stipularis =

Scientific classification
- Kingdom: Plantae
- Clade: Tracheophytes
- Clade: Angiosperms
- Clade: Eudicots
- Clade: Rosids
- Order: Oxalidales
- Family: Elaeocarpaceae
- Genus: Elaeocarpus
- Species: E. stipularis

Binomial name
- Elaeocarpus stipularis Blume

Synonyms
- Elaeocarpus fissistipulus Miq.; Elaeocarpus helferi Kurz ex Mast.; Elaeocarpus tomentosus Blume

Species of flowering plant

Elaeocarpus stipularis is a tree in the Elaeocarpaceae family. It is found from the Aru Islands, eastern Indonesia, to Philippines, and through Mainland Southeast Asia to Odisha, India. It has edible fruit, its wood is used and some medical uses are ascribed to it.

== Description ==
The evergreen, 10–20 m (33–66 ft) tall tree has a simple broad leaves. Its wood density is 0.46g/cm^{3} It fruits from November to May in Selangor, Malaysia.

== Infraspecifics ==
The following varieties are accepted:

- Elaeocarpus stipularis var. alticola Coode
- Elaeocarpus stipularis var. atjehensis Coode
- Elaeocarpus stipularis var. brevipes (Merr.) Coode
- Elaeocarpus stipularis var. castaneus (Merr.) Coode
- Elaeocarpus stipularis var. longipetiolatus (Merr.) Coode
- Elaeocarpus stipularis var. nutans (R.Knuth) Coode
- Elaeocarpus stipularis var. rejangensis (R.Knuth) Coode
- Elaeocarpus stipularis var. siamensis (Craib) Coode

Some of these varieties are synonymous with formerly accepted species:

- variety brevipes has the synonyms: Elaeocarpus baramensis Knuth; Elaeocarpus brevipes Merr.
- variety castaneus has the synonyms: Elaeocarpus castaneus Merr.; Elaeocarpus gambir Becc.
- variety longipetiolatus has the synonym Elaeocarpus longipetiolatus Merr.
- variety nutans has the synonym Elaeocarpus nutans Knuth.
- variety rejangensis has the synonym Elaeocarpus rejangensis Knuth.
- variety siamensis has the synonyms: Elaeocarpus siamensis Craib; Elaeocarpus wallichii Kurz.

== Distribution ==
The species is found from northwestern islands of the Sahul/Australian continent, across southern Wallacea and throughout Southeast Asia: Indonesia (Aru Islands, southern Maluku, East and West Nusa Tenggara, Bali, Jawa, Sumatera, Kalimantan), Timor Leste, Singapore, Malaysia (Peninsular Malaysia, Sabah, Sarawak, Brunei, the Philippines (Mindanao including Bangsamoro and Mimaropa), Thailand, Cambodia, Vietnam, Laos, Myanmar and India (Andaman Islands, Nicobar Islands, Odisha).

The varieties alticola and atjehensis are found in Sumatera. The varieties brevipes, castaneus and rejangensis are found in Borneo. The varieties longipetiolatus and nutans are found from Borneo to the Philippines (notably Palawan for var. longipetiolatus and the Sulu Archipelago for var. nutans) The variety siamensis is found in Thailand, Myanmar and India (including Assam and notably Odisha).

== Habitat ==
In Cambodia and Vietnam it is found in open formations and in gallery forests, the edges of dense/closed forests. In Thailand's Thung Yai Naresuan Wildlife Sanctuary it is a component of semievergreen forest.

== Ecology ==
Parts of the plant (particularly the fruit) are eaten by the fruitbats Balionycteris maculata, Chironax melanocephalus, Cynopterus brachyotis and Cynopterus horsfieldii, the kanchil Tragulus kanchil, the langur Presbytis femoralis, the pheasant Lophura erythrophthalma, the porcupine Trichys fasciculata, the rats Leopoldamys sabanus and Maxomys whiteheadi, the squirrels Rhinosciurus laticaudatus and Lariscus insignis, and the treeshrew Tupaia glis. In Thung Yai Naresuan Wildlife Sanctuary, Thailand, the Asian black bear (Ursus thibetanus) and the sun bear (Helarctos malayanus) consume the fruit.

== Vernacular names ==
Common names for the tree include: balunijok (Karo, Sumatera); mendong (Temuan people, Malaysia). sa:ng nha:ng (Khmer); sein-se-ba-lu (southern Shan State, Myanmar).

== Uses ==
The trunk of the species is used to make short-lived constructions in Cambodia, while the twigs are often used as firewood. Amongst inhabitants of southern Shan State, Myanmar, the fruit of the var. siamensis are eaten. The bark of the taxa is used by the Karo people of Sumatera to treat impotence. The Temuan people living in the Ayer Hitam Forest of Selangor, Malaysia, use a poultice of pulped leaves of the tree to treat sores.

== History ==
Karl Ludwig von Blume, a botanist born in Braunschweig but who studied in the Netherlands, described the nominate species in his Bijdragen tot de Flora van Nederlandsch Indië (Contributions to the Flora of the Netherlandish Indies) in 1825. Mark James Elgar Coode (born 1937), British botanist, reviewed the taxa and published the accepted varieties in the Kew Bulletin in 2001, see below.
