= Balionycteris seimundi =

Conservation status
- Least Concern (IUCN 3.1)

Scientific classification
- Kingdom: Animalia
- Phylum: Chordata
- Class: Mammalia
- Order: Chiroptera
- Family: Pteropodidae
- Genus: Balionycteris
- Species: B. seimundi

Binomial name
- Balionycteris seimundi Kloss, 1921

Species of bat

Balionycteris seimundi is a species of megabat found in Malaysia.

== Taxonomy ==
Balionycteris seimundi was described in 1921 by C. Boden Kloss. He noted it as a subspecies of spotted-winged fruit bat, with a scientific name of Balionycteris maculata seimundi. The holotype had been collected by Eibert Seimund, who became the epithet for the name seimundi. Seimmund had collected the holotype in Pahang, Malaysia. Later genetic studies showed that there was a larger-than-expected genetic distance of 12% between B. m. seimundi and B. m. maculata, which was used to justify its elevation to a full species.

== Description ==
Balionycteris seimundi is a small megabat, weighing only 10–15 g (0.35–0.53 oz). It has a forearm length of 40–45 mm (1.6–1.8 in). Its fur is blackish brown on its back and somewhat paler on its underside.

== Range and habitat ==
Balionycteris seimundi is widely distributed in Peninsular Malaysia. Its range likely includes other countries in Southeast Asia, including Thailand and Indonesia (Sumatra and the Riau Archipelago). They roost in small groups in palm trees, termite nests, epiphytic ferns, and, occasionally, caves. Its habitat includes lowland rainforests at elevations from sea level to 1,500 m (4,900 ft) above sea level.
