= Monfort Bat Sanctuary =

Bat sanctuary in the Philippines

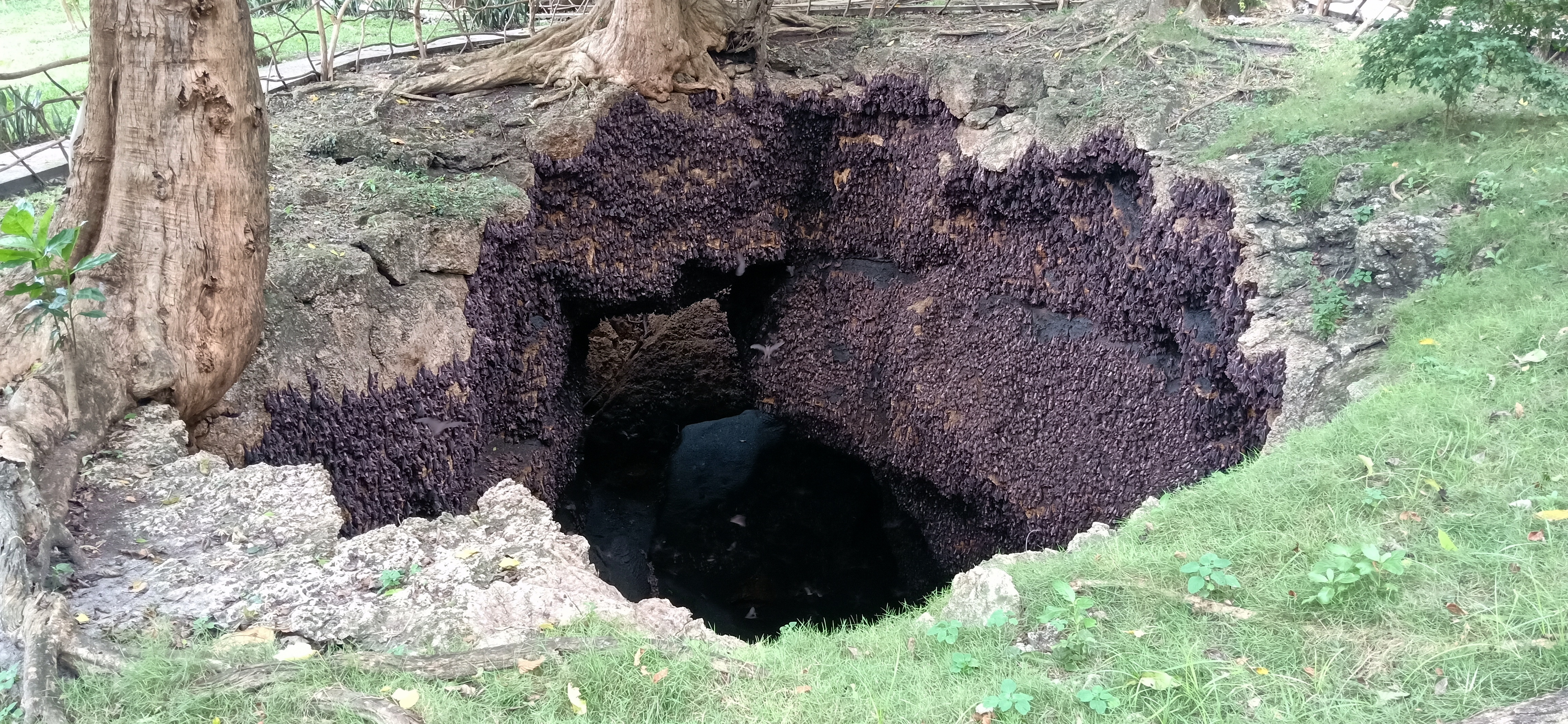
One of the five cave entrances at the Monfort Bat Sanctuary

Monfort Bat Sanctuary has been the house of a large colony of 2.3 million Rousette fruit bats since recorded history. They cover 75% of the ceilings and walls of their 245 ft (75 m)-long cave. The sanctuary is located on Samal Island, about 1 kilometre (0.62 mi) east of Davao City, Philippines. According to Guinness World Records, it is the largest single colony of this kind.

== Fruit bats ==
Fruit bats are an extremely popular type of bat that can also be called megabats. The bats originate from tropical regions of the Old World. They do not hibernate and since they dislike the cold, tropical regions suit them best. Fruit bats diet includes fruit and nectar. During their Circadian flight, fruit bats gather 1.5 to 3 times their body weight in food. Certain types of fruit bats have short jaws and powerful teeth to pierce into fruit. Others have long tongues and snouts to reach pollen and nectar. They can search up to 30 mi (48 km) to find food. Some types of fruit bats can have a five-feet wing span, the largest of all bats. Other fruit bats only have a six-centimeter long wing span. All but a few types of fruit bats are nocturnal. The ones occupying the Monfort Bat Sanctuary are nocturnal. These bats are quite rare because they are killed for food. Other predators include crows, rats, 10 ft (3.0 m)-long reticulated pythons, and lizards. Usually fruit bats can survive these creature attacks. Their major predators are feral dogs and cats, which increases the risks of rabies transmission amongst them.

== Owner ==
The Iñigo-Monfort family has maintained the area since the 1900s. Norma Monfort is the current owner of the 57 acres of land, including its 1.8 million fruit bats. She enclosed the property to discourage any possible bat hunters. Additionally, she hired 24-hour guards to protect the bats. Norma Monfort was named 2011 Disney Worldwide Conservation Fund Hero.

== Sightseeing ==
With such an abundant amount of fruit bats, visitors can get an up close look from outside any of the five entrances. Visitors cannot enter because any disturbance can cause panic to the bats. Late afternoon is suggested to be the best time to visit because of the daily circadian flight. The circadian flight occurs right after sunset, when millions of bats fly out of the cave to find food. There are informational tours that bring visitors to the sanctuary. It is estimated about 400 students visit daily. It's also possible to visit after sunset, starting at 18:00, but only by appointment, and in maximum groups of six persons.
