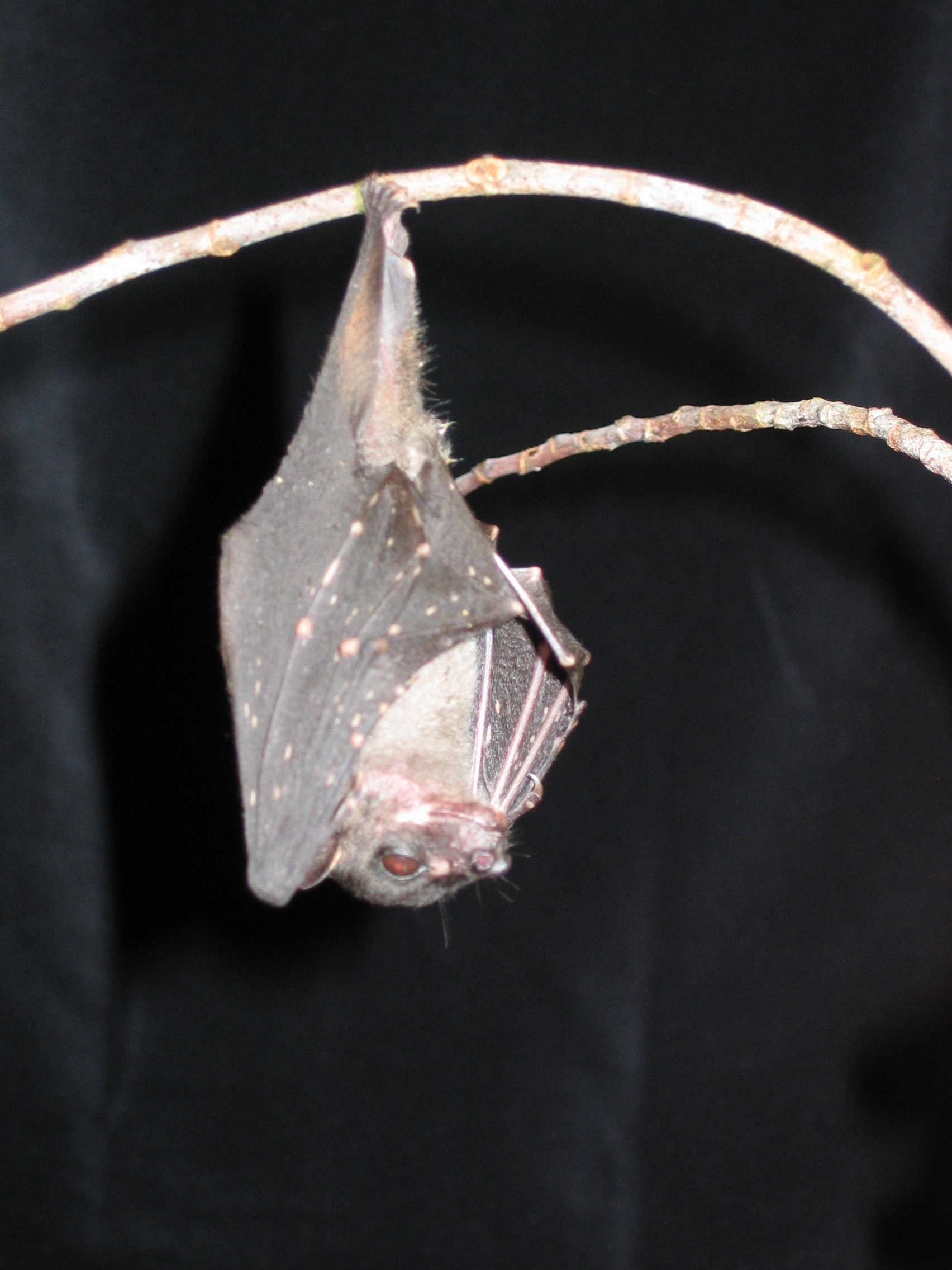
- Spotted-winged fruit bat

Scientific classification
- Domain: Eukaryota
- Kingdom: Animalia
- Phylum: Chordata
- Class: Mammalia
- Order: Chiroptera
- Family: Pteropodidae
- Subfamily: Cynopterinae
- Genus: Balionycteris; Matschie, 1899

Type species
- Balionycteris maculata (Thomas, 1893)

Species
- Balionycteris maculata; Balionycteris seimundi

= Balionycteris =

Genus of bats

Balionycteris is a genus of megabat. There are two recognized species:

- Spotted-winged fruit bat (B. maculata)
- Balionycteris seimundi
