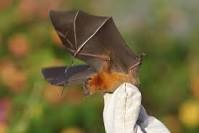
- A. aequalis

Scientific classification
- Kingdom: Animalia
- Phylum: Chordata
- Class: Mammalia
- Order: Chiroptera
- Family: Pteropodidae
- Subfamily: Cynopterinae
- Genus: Aethalops; Thomas, 1923

Type species
- Aethalodes alecto Thomas, 1923

Species
- Aethalops aequalis Aethalops alecto

= Aethalops =

Genus of bats

Aethalops (Meaning: sooty bat) is a genus of megabats in the family Pteropodidae. It contains two species:

- Borneo fruit bat, A. aequalis
- Pygmy fruit bat, A. alecto

== Taxonomy ==
Aethalops was described as a new genus in 1923 by British mammalogist Oldfield Thomas. Thomas named the genus Aethalodes, though that name was already in use for a genus of beetle. Thomas then suggested the name Aethalops in a subsequent publication to remedy the problem. The type species for the genus was the pygmy fruit bat, Aethalops alecto, which had been collected in Sumatra by Lambertus Johannes Toxopeus.

In 1938, the genus gained its second species, the Borneo fruit bat, A. aequalis. This species was described by American zoologist Glover Morrill Allen. The holotype was collected in 1937 in Mount Kinabalu, Malaysia, which is on the island of Borneo. It was collected by J. Augustus Griswold, Jr. while on the Harvard Primate Expedition led by Harold Jefferson Coolidge Jr.

The genus has been revised over the years, with some authors considering it monotypic, or only containing one species. The Borneo fruit bat has, at times, been considered a synonym of the pygmy fruit bat. As of 2019, the prevailing consensus is that the genus does, in fact, contain two species.

== Description ==
The two Aethalops species are among the smallest megabats. Individuals weigh approximately 19.3 g (0.68 oz) and have a head and body length of 65–73 mm (2.6–2.9 in). Individuals lack an external tail. Aethalops species' fur color is black or dark gray, and they have small ears.

== Conservation ==
As of 2016, both species have an IUCN status of least concern.
