= Samal, Davao del Norte =

Component city in Davao del Norte, Philippines

Samal
- Component city
- Island Garden City of Samal
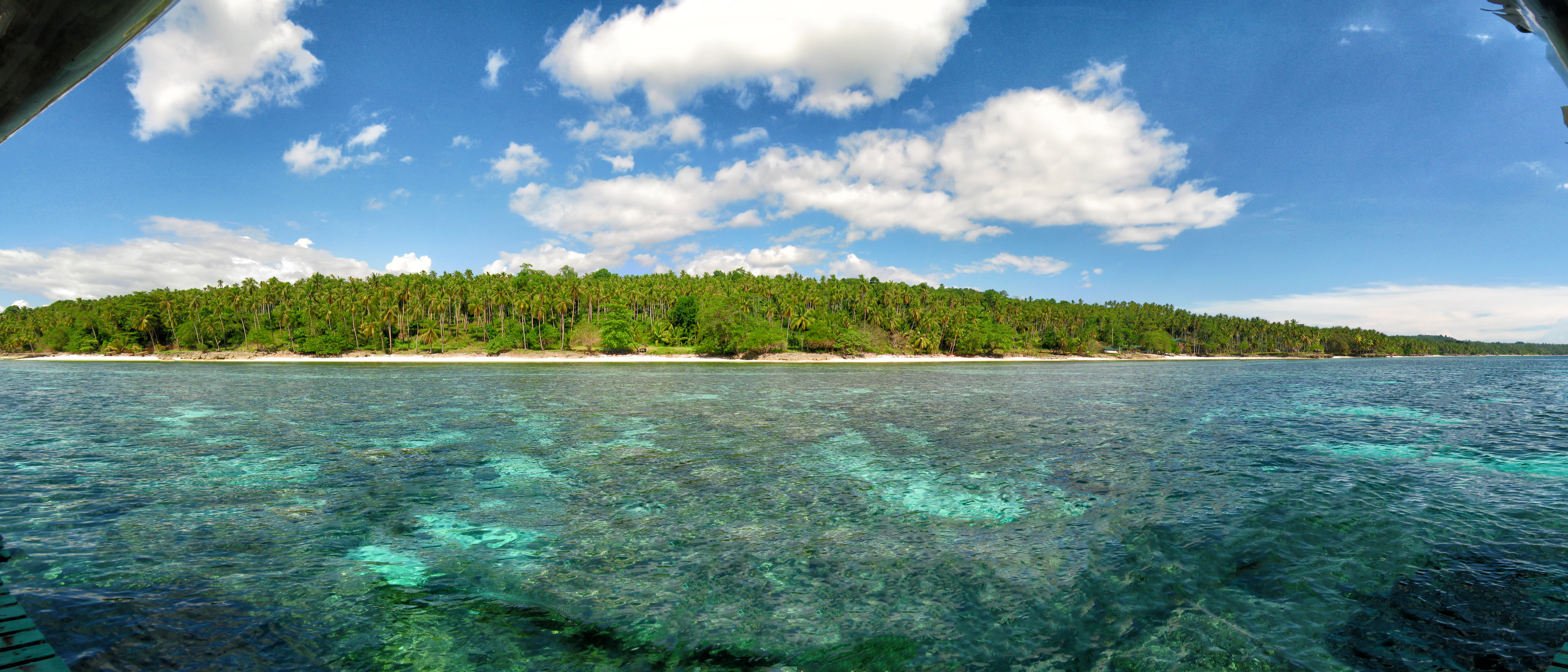

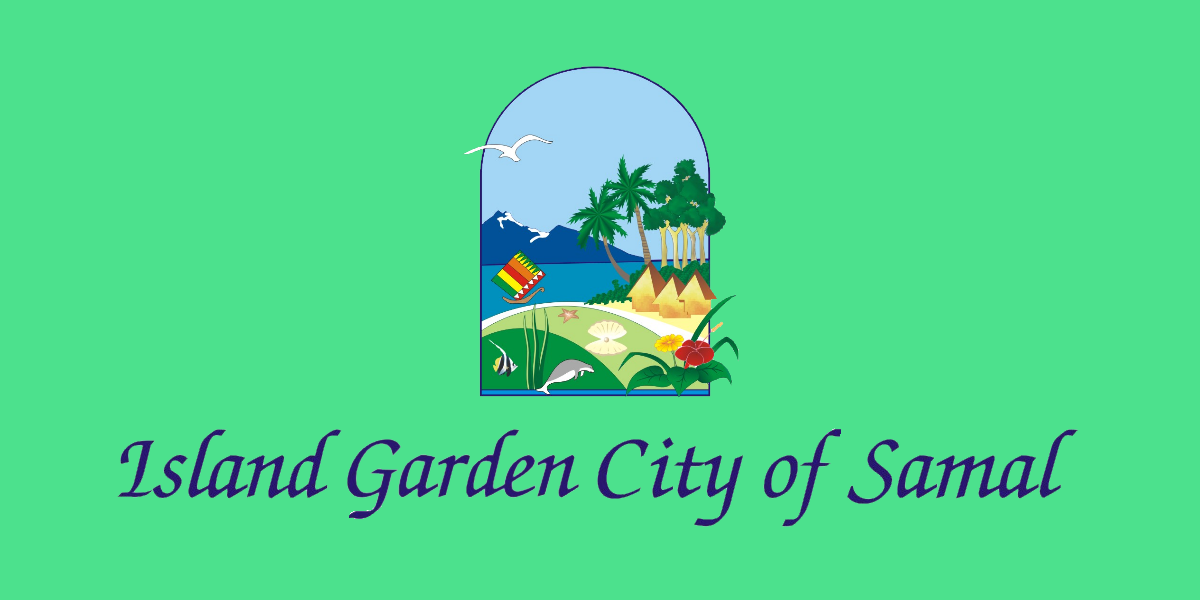
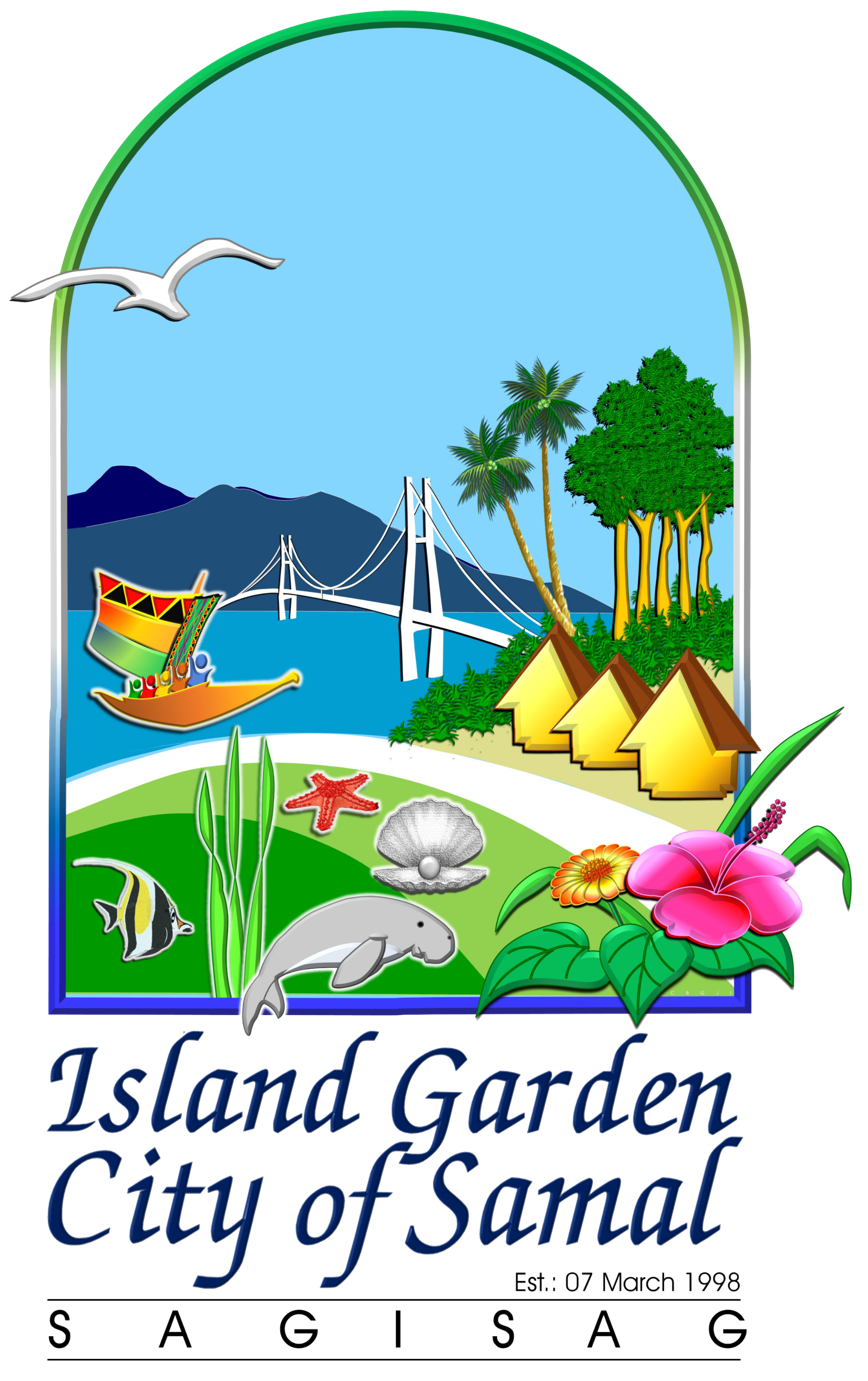
- Flag Seal
- Nickname: The Attractive Resort of Davao Del Norte
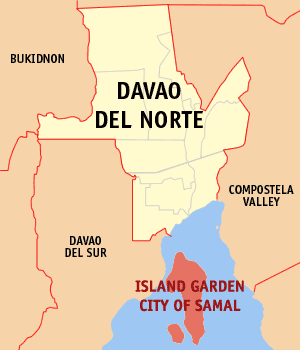
- Map of Davao del Norte, Davao with Samal highlighted
- Interactive map of Samal
- Location within the Philippines
- Coordinates: 7°04′42″N 125°42′42″E
- Country: Philippines
- Region: Davao Region
- Province: Davao del Norte
- District: 2nd district
- Founded: July 8, 1948
- Cityhood: January 30, 1998
- Barangays: 46 (see Barangays)

Government
  - Type: Sangguniang Panlungsod
  - Mayor: Lemuel "Toto" Reyes
  - Vice Mayor: Richard "Chang" Guindolman
  - Representative: JM Lagdameo
  - City Council: Members: Babak District; Clavel Ann A. David; Renz Allan S. Lacorte; Dan P. Gervacio; Farrah A. Jansol; Peñaplata (Samal) District; Peter Paul L. Quezada; Gemarjan T. Batiancila; Ginaphine C. Cañete; Darwin S. Arig; Kaputian district; Aldwin M. Jumao-as; Violito S. Claros; Carmeglynn L. Uy; Alfredo L. Esteban Jr.
  - Electorate: 87,944 voters (2025)

Area
  - Total: 301.30 km^{2} (116.33 sq mi)
- Elevation: 32 m (105 ft)
- Highest elevation (Mount Puting-Bato): 535 m (1,755 ft)
- Lowest elevation: 0 m (0 ft)

Population (2024 census)
  - Total: 119,701
  - Density: 397.28/km^{2} (1,029.0/sq mi)
  - Households: 29,973

Economy
  - Income class: 2nd city income class
  - Poverty incidence: 11.81% (2023)
  - Revenue: ₱ 1,321 million (2024)
  - Assets: ₱ 3,216 million (2024)
  - Expenditure: ₱ 1,271 million (2024)
  - Liabilities: ₱ 1,244 million (2024)

Service provider
  - Electricity: Davao Light and Power Company (DLPC)
  - Water: Island Garden City of Samal Water District (IGaCoS-WD)
  - Telecommunications: PLDT; Globe Telecom; Dito Telecommunity; Converge ICT
- Time zone: UTC+8 (PST)
- ZIP code: 8118 (Babak), 8119 (Peñaplata), 8120 (Kaputian)
- PSGC: 112317000
- IDD : area code: +63 (0)84
- Native languages: Davawenyo; Cebuano; Ata Manobo; Kalagan; Tagalog
- Website: samalcity.gov.ph

Samal, officially the Island Garden City of Samal (IGaCOS; Cebuano: Pulong Harding Dakbayan sa Samal; Filipino: Pulong Harding Lungsod ng Samal) is a component city in the province of Davao del Norte, Philippines. According to the 2024 census, it has a population of 119,701 people.

It is made up of Samal Island and the smaller Talikud Island in Davao Gulf, from the merger of former municipalities of Samal, Babak, and Kaputian.

Samal is a part of the Metropolitan Davao area and is 2 km (1.2 mi) away from Davao City, in mainland Mindanao, the largest city and the primary economic center of that island.

== Etymology ==
Features of the Island Garden City of Samal

The name Samal was derived from the Sama-Bajau peoples, the natives who were the first inhabitants of the island. The first datu on the island was Datu Taganiyug, a native of what is now Peñaplata, today the governance center of the city. In the past, the people of the island named a place about what the said place is known for. For example, the name Peñaplata is said to be derived from the word "piña" or pineapple because of the abundance of pineapple in the area; this, however, is folk etymology, for peñaplata means "rock of silver" in Spanish. Tagpopongan is the first barangay on the island whose name was from the word "tagpo" or meet. It was so called because this place was chosen by the datus as their meeting place. The word Samal was also known before because it was commonly used as a surname by datu. It also based on the word samel, a covering attached to a banca to protect the passengers from the sun and rain, made of nipa leaves and woven together.

== History ==
=== Early beginnings ===
The island was initially home to the Muslim Sama-Bajau people, though it was also settled by the animistic Mansakas and Mandayas from northern and eastern parts of Davao Region in the mainland. These settlers intermarried and were organized into communities, dynastically ruled by a datu until the early 20th century. Centuries later, Spain first reached Samal Island and managed to conquer the island in the late 1840s when Nueva Vergara (Davao City today) in the mainland was established.

=== World War 2 ===
The Pacific War, which happened during World War II, struck the island. Japanese fighter planes bombed the island. Japanese forces occupied the island and forced the people to work for four years until they were expelled by the Allied forces. After the war, infrastructure was built, such as schools, churches, and stores in the area.

=== Official founding of the municipality ===
The time came on July 8, 1948, when the entire island itself became part of the newly created municipality of Samal; it was the official founding of the municipality. Five years later in 1953, the municipality of Babak was created from Samal, marking the political division of the island between the two municipalities. The island experienced further political division when the municipality of Kaputian was created from the island in 1966. During this period, the standard of living in these three municipalities became low and extremely rural.

=== Proposed province ===
In 1969, a proposal to create the sub-province of Samal was created by Republic Act No. 5999 and covered the area of the present-day city. The act was enacted without President Ferdinand Marcos' approval. However, the sub-province was never inaugurated.

=== Cityhood ===
The city was created through Republic Act No. 8471 on January 30, 1998. This act paved the way for the dissolution and merger of the three former municipalities of Samal, Babak, and Kaputian into one local government unit by turning them into districts, now officially named IGaCoS, the Island Garden City of Samal. The first city mayor was Rogelio P. Antalan, who later served for three consecutive terms from 1998 to 2007.

On April 19, 2000, Air Philippines Flight 541 crashed in the city, killing all 131 people on board.

=== Hostage crisis ===
On September 22, 2015, Kjartan Sekkingstad, aged 55, from Sotra, Norway, was abducted by Abu Sayyaf Islamist guerrillas from a high-end tourist resort on Samal Island, along with two Canadian men, John Ridsdel, aged 68, and Robert Hall, aged 67, and a Filipina woman, Marites Flor, Hall's girlfriend. In April and June 2016, the Canadians were beheaded after ransoms were not paid, and in June 2016 Flor was released. On September 17, 2016, Sekkingstad was released on Jolo island, 600 miles south of Manila after captor Abu Sayyaf received $638,000 in ransom for his release. He was handed over to another rebel group, the Moro National Liberation Front. The MNLF was in peace talks with the government and had been working with authorities to secure Sekkingstad's release. It is not known who paid the ransom for Sekkingstad, but it was not the Norwegian government.

== Geography ==
The Island Garden City of Samal is located in the Davao Gulf, just off the Mindanao mainland. Samal is also the only city in the country that encompasses two entire islands, hence its name, the Island Garden City. While pristine beaches dot the island's shores, hills dominate the central portions of the island. Talikud Island is located southwest of the main island.

Samal enjoys an evenly distributed rainfall throughout the year and a typhoon-free climate, which makes it ideal for agricultural production and tourism.

=== Climate ===
Climate data for Samal, Davao del Norte
Month	Jan	Feb	Mar	Apr	May	Jun	Jul	Aug	Sep	Oct	Nov	Dec	Year
Mean daily maximum °C (°F)	29 (84)	30 (86)	30 (86)	30 (86)	31 (88)	31 (88)	30 (86)	30 (86)	30 (86)	30 (86)	30 (86)	30 (86)	30 (86)
Mean daily minimum °C (°F)	22 (72)	22 (72)	22 (72)	22 (72)	23 (73)	24 (75)	24 (75)	24 (75)	24 (75)	24 (75)	23 (73)	22 (72)	23 (73)
Average precipitation mm (inches)	98 (3.9)	86 (3.4)	91 (3.6)	83 (3.3)	133 (5.2)	158 (6.2)	111 (4.4)	101 (4.0)	94 (3.7)	117 (4.6)	131 (5.2)	94 (3.7)	1,297 (51.2)
Average rainy days	16.4	14.3	16.3	18.5	25.3	25.0	23.8	21.9	20.8	24.4	24.3	18.7	249.7
Source: Meteoblue (modeled/calculated data, not measured locally)

=== Barangays ===
Samal is politically subdivided into 46 barangays. Each barangay consists of puroks while some have sitios.

In 1955, the sitios of Mambago, San Isidro, Santo Niño, San Antonio, San Agustin, Dangcaan, Balet, Tambo, Camudmud, and Cogon were converted into barrios of the now-defunct municipality of Babak.

- Adecor
- Anonang
- Aumbay
- Aundanao
- Balet
- Bandera
- Caliclic (Dangca-an)
- Camudmud
- Catagman
- Cawag
- Cogon
- Cogon (Talikud)
- Dadatan
- Del Monte
- Guilon
- Kanaan
- Kinawitnon
- Libertad
- Libuak
- Licup
- Limao
- Linosutan
- Mambago-A
- Mambago-B
- Miranda (Poblacion)
- Moncado (Villarica) (Poblacion)
- Pangubatan
- Peñaplata (Poblacion)
- Poblacion (Kaputian)
- San Agustin
- San Antonio
- San Isidro (Babak)
- San Isidro (Kaputian)
- San Jose (San Lapuz)
- San Miguel (Magamomo)
- San Remigio
- Santa Cruz (Talicod II)
- Santo Niño
- Sion (Zion)
- Tagbaobo
- Tagbay
- Tagbitan-ag
- Tagdaliao
- Tagpopongan
- Tambo
- Toril

== Demographics ==
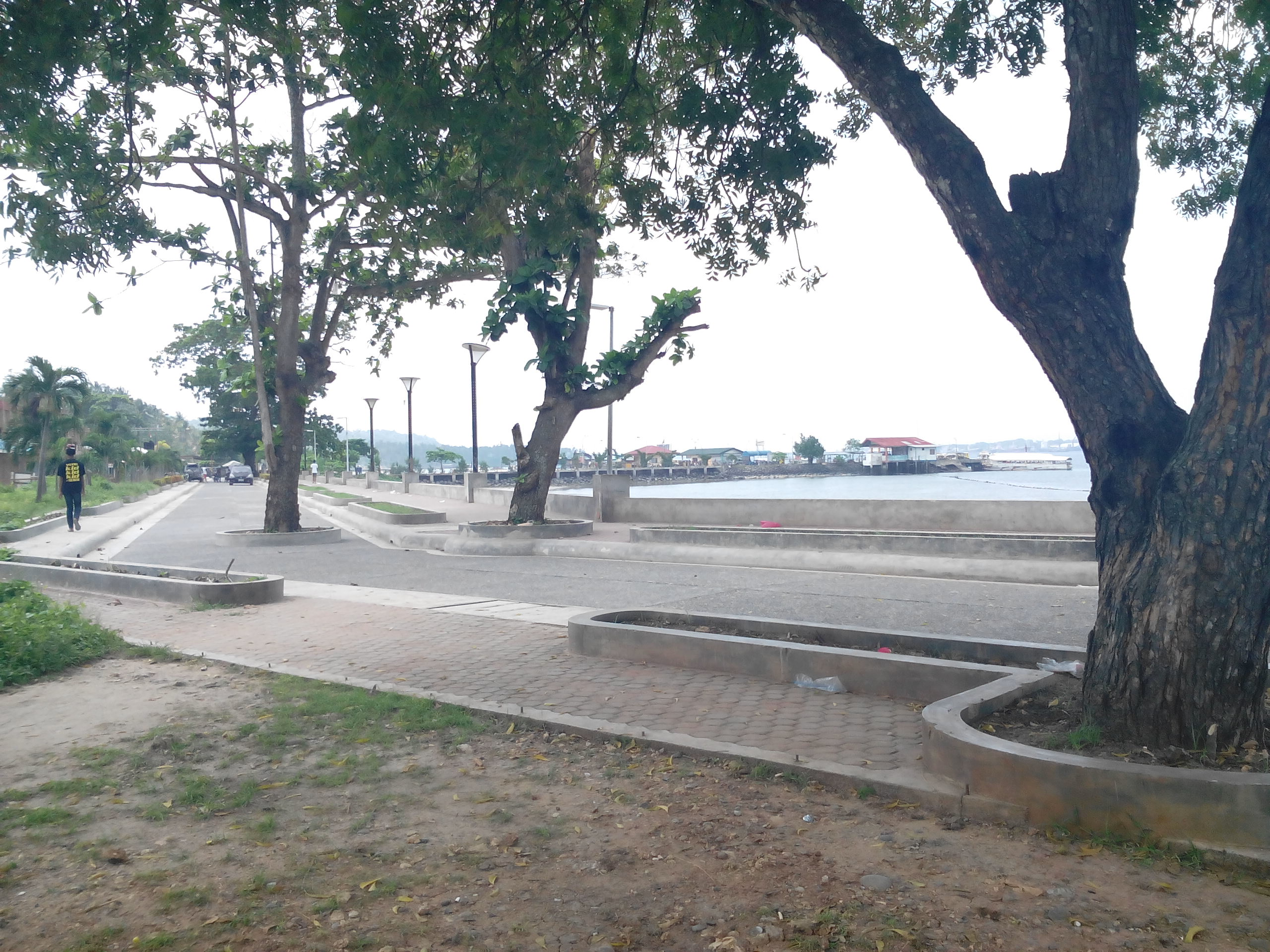
Baywalk in Babak District, Samal Island

Population census of Samal

Year	Pop.	±% p.a.
1918	1,956	—
1939	7,473	+6.59%
1948	20,334	+11.76%
1960	36,161	+4.91%
1970	50,839	+3.46%
1975	56,144	+2.01%
1980	62,423	+2.14%
1990	69,640	+1.10%

Year	Pop.	±% p.a.
1995	76,995	+1.90%
2000	82,609	+1.52%
2007	90,291	+1.23%
2010	95,874	+2.21%
2015	104,123	+1.58%
2020	116,771	+2.44%
2024	119,701	+0.60%

Source: Philippine Statistics Authority

Cebuano is the common language spoken of the people of Samal Island, followed by Isama, and Tausug.

== Economy ==
Poverty incidence of Samal (%)

Source: Philippine Statistics Authority

=== Agriculture ===
The city's economy depends greatly on its agricultural production. Copra, mango, corn, vegetables, citrus, and fish are the major products of the island. Livestock production is also a major product with Davao City in the mainland Mindanao as the primary market. In addition, rice is also produced in the barangays of Libuak in Babak District and Aumbay in Peñaplata District.

=== Tourism ===
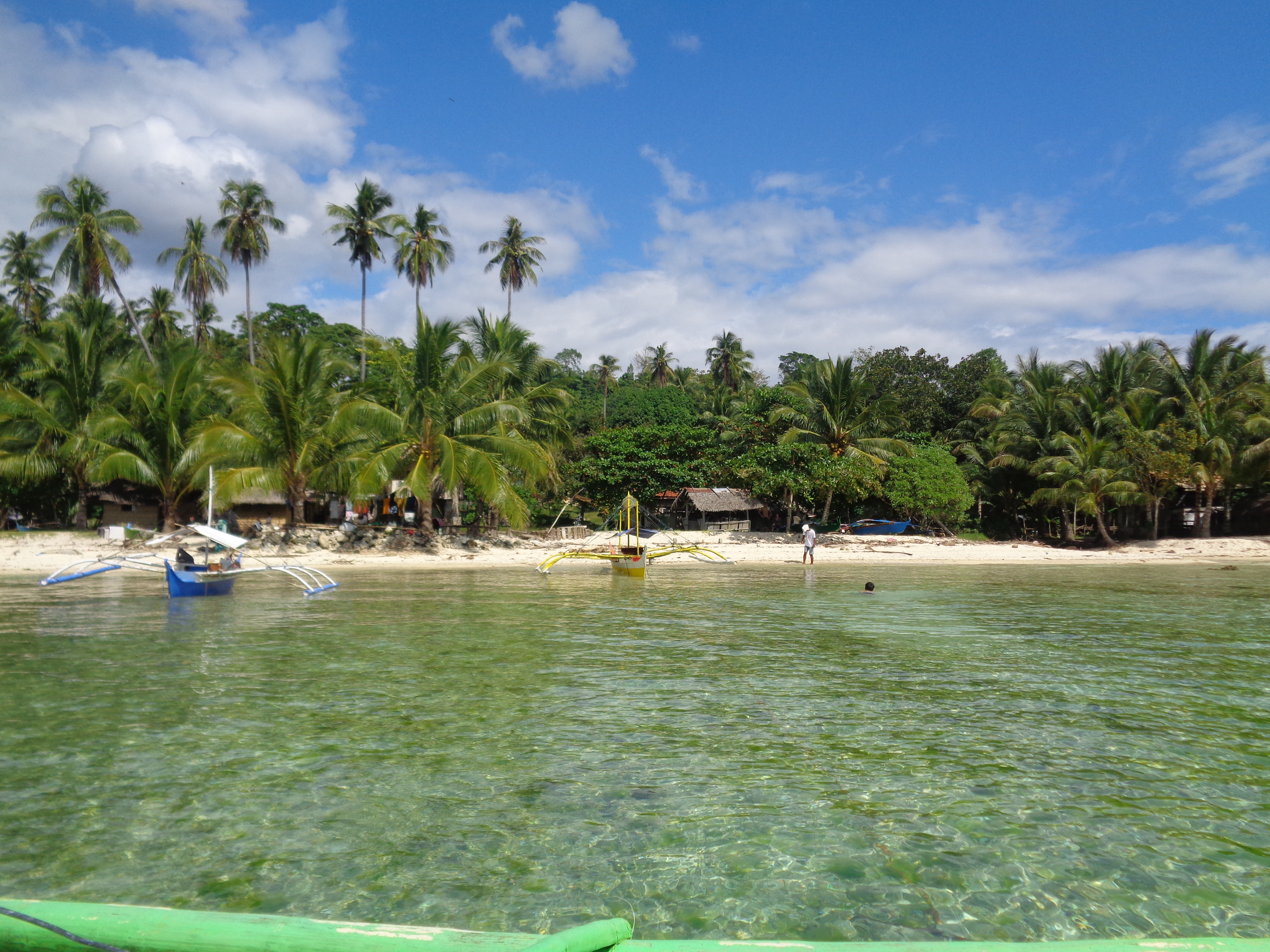
Beach in Kaputian, Samal Island

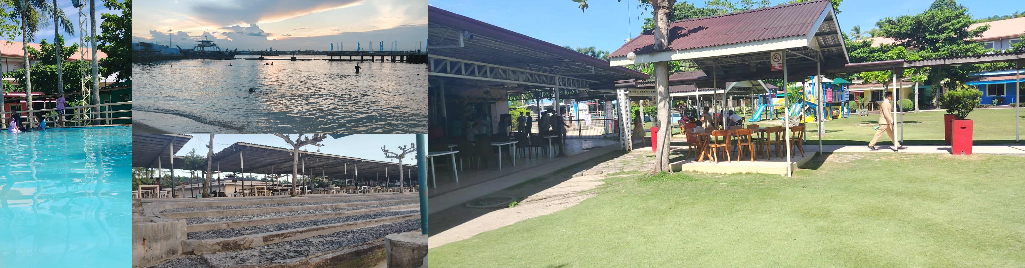
A photo montage of Camp Holiday Beach Resort in Babak, Samal Island

The city is the largest resort city in the country. It has good beaches and houses many beach resorts. It has also numerous marine reefs and tranquil waters that lure tourists to visit them, especially on Talikud Island. There are 34 registered resorts with a combined capacity of 1,000 rooms in the city. Because of these, the Department of Tourism named it one of the best visiting islands in Mindanao and currently one of the fastest growing tourist destinations in the country. Thus, tourism is the main source of income in the city. Biggest taxes are imposed to tourism and resort industry.

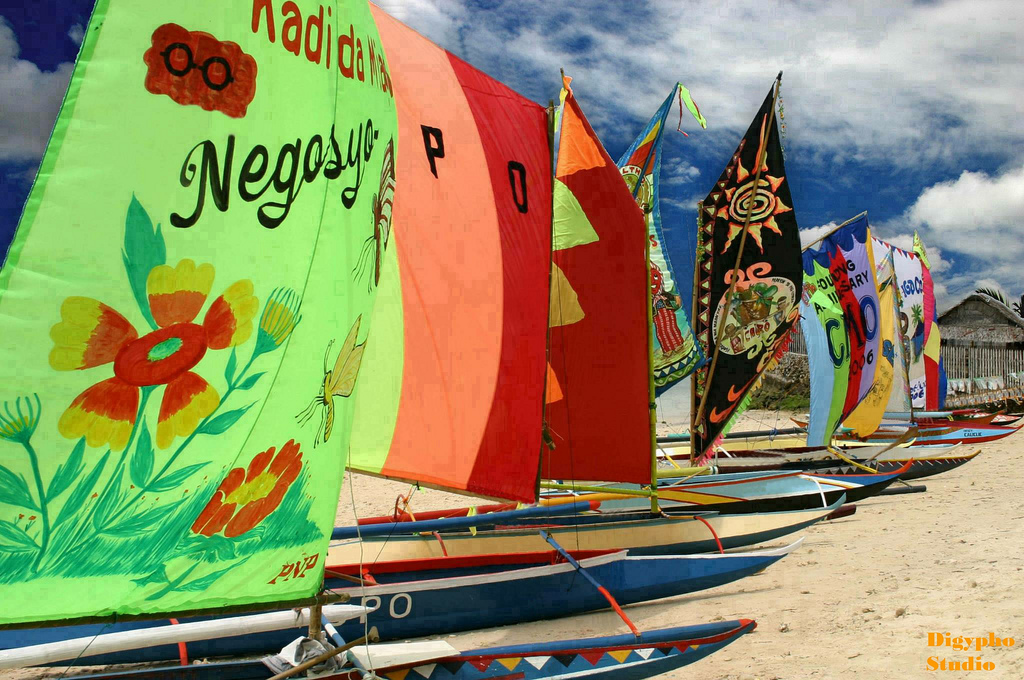
Bigiw sailboats in Samal Island

There are three main festivals held annually in the city, namely:

- Kabasan Festival, coincides with the founding of Babak municipality every year in May, features bikini open contests, fireworks display, street-dancing and street parties, and motocross events
- White Nights Festival, takes place every two days with Kaputian as the venue, celebrating the city's cultural and historical heritage; and
- Hugyaw Madayaw Festival, a spin-off of Davao's Kadayawan Festival which is also held annually in August, and also an attempt to preserve the diminishing Sama culture in the island.

Monfort Bat Sanctuary, the world's largest fruit bat colony, is also located in the island.

=== Fishing ===
Fishing is also a growing business sector in this city, since the city was situated on the island, it cannot fully complement the demand for meat products imported from other parts of the country, especially in nearby Davao City and in other parts of the mainland Mindanao. The city has no both container port and deep-water transport terminal, except for a barge wharf at Babak district, to deliver market products directly to the city, so the city government advocated building fishery complexes across the city to minimize the demand for market products imported to the city. Fish, pearls, and edible crustaceans such as shrimps, prawns, and crabs are the main aquatic consumable products in the city.

== Government ==
The center of city governance is located at Barangay Peñaplata, Samal District, situated at the west central coast of the island. The city has three districts: Babak, Samal and Kaputian. These districts used to serve as separate towns until the 1998 city merger.

== Transportation ==
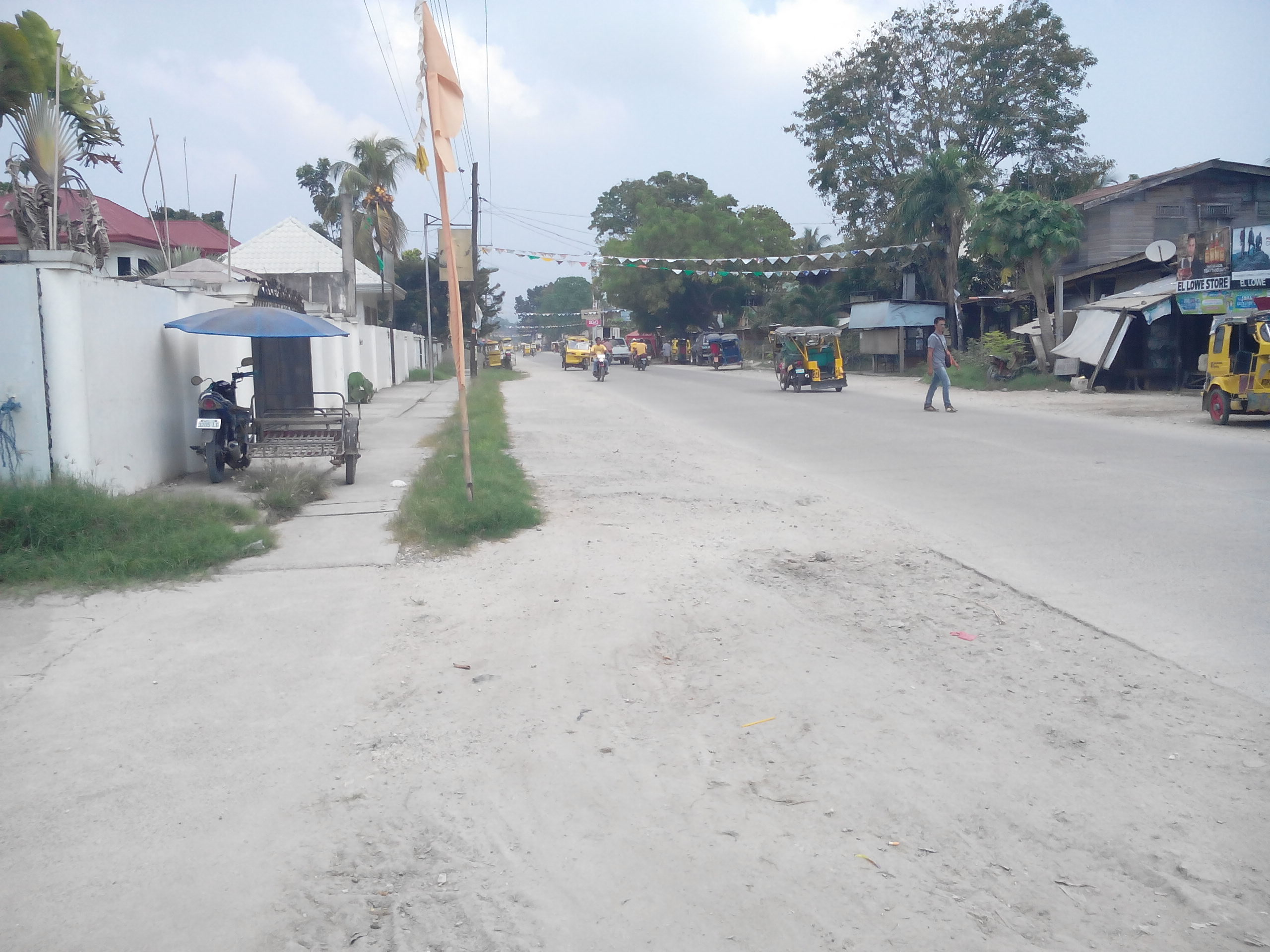
Samal Circumferential Road in Babak District, Samal Island

Barge/ferry service or passenger boats from the Sasa Wharf & Santa Ana Wharf in Davao City serves the island city, accessing both Samal and mainland Mindanao. The modes of transportation on the island are motorcycles, tricycles or trikes, and bus and private car services offered by resorts.

Bus operators:

1. Island City Express (operated by Mindanao Star) daily route to Kaputian, Babak, Peñaplata from mainland Mindanao via Davao City (via Kinawitnon ferry port).

=== Proposed Samal-Davao Bridge ===
Efforts to link Samal Island to mainland Mindanao via Davao City have been going on for decades. One of the earliest records of government attempts to get the project going is a news item from the Mindanao Times dated January 18, 1979, with the headline titled “Bridge to Link City and Samal”. It was not the first time that such project had been proposed. Several years earlier, talk of a bridge surfaced when an aluminum plant was being planned to be built on Samal Island by an eight-nation consortium of giant corporations.

Decades later, talks of the proposed project resurfaced notably through informal surveys among both Davao City and Samal Island residents about the bridge with majority (138 out of 150 individuals) said they agreed the construction of the project. Few years later, 3.98-kilometer bridge, a flagship project under the “Build, Build, Build” program during the administration of former President Rodrigo Duterte, will be hugely funded through a loan agreement with the Chinese government. The project groundbreaking ceremony soon led by Duterte's successor, President Bongbong Marcos who was joined by Duterte's daughter Vice President Sara Duterte and her brother, Rodrigo's son Davao City mayor Baste Duterte. The project is scheduled to be completed in 2027.

== Sister cities ==
=== Local ===
- Las Piñas, Philippines

== See also ==
- International Seaport of Davao
