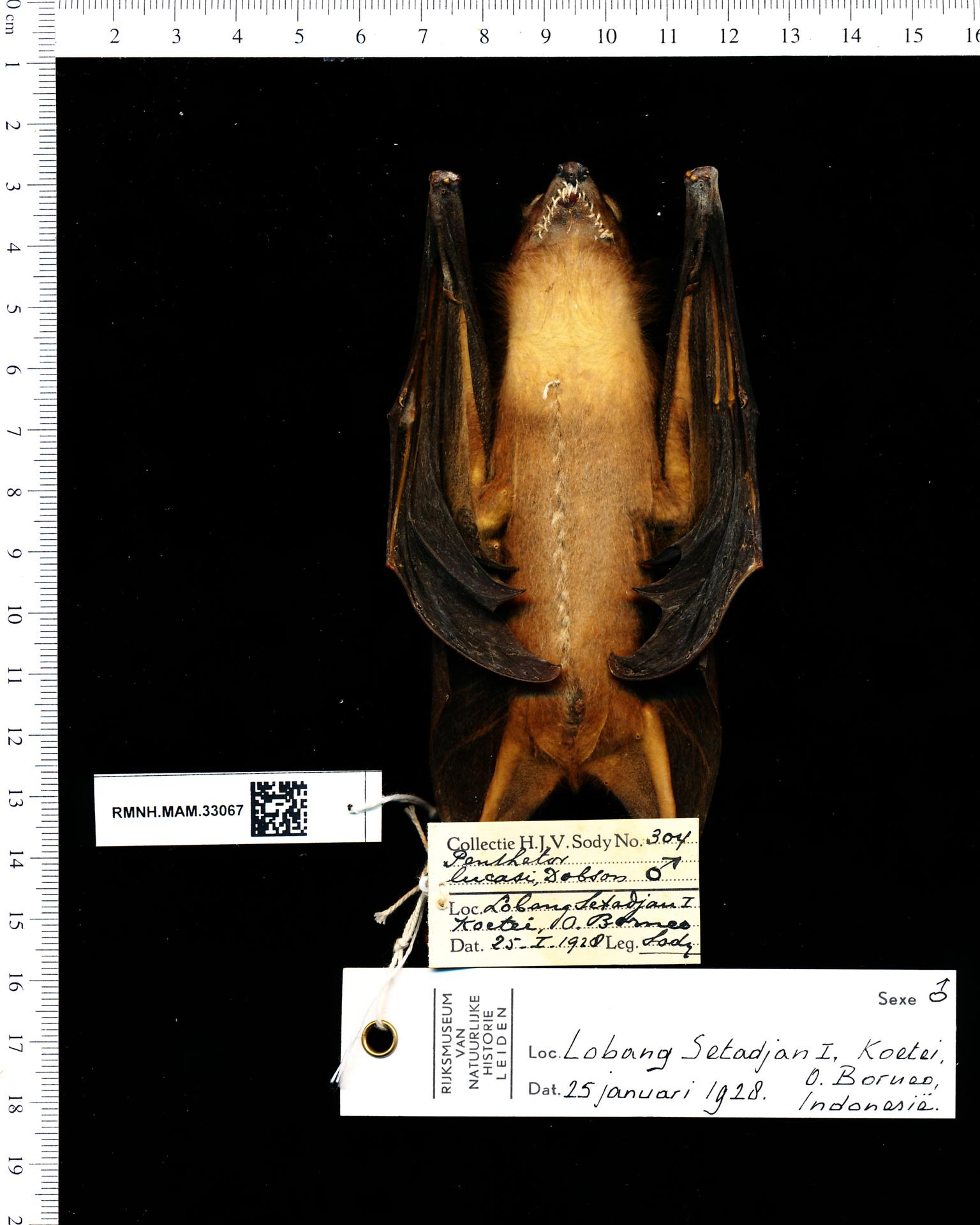

Conservation status
- Least Concern (IUCN 3.1)

Scientific classification
- Kingdom: Animalia
- Phylum: Chordata
- Class: Mammalia
- Order: Chiroptera
- Family: Pteropodidae
- Genus: Penthetor; K. Andersen, 1912
- Species: P. lucasi

Binomial name
- Penthetor lucasi Dobson, 1880
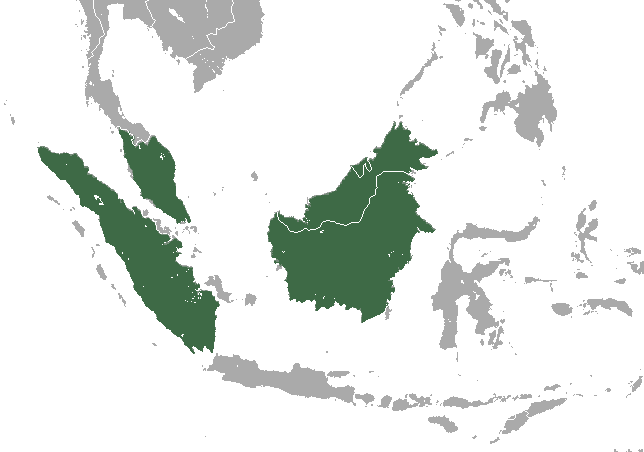
- Dusky fruit bat range

= Dusky fruit bat =

Species of bat

The dusky fruit bat (Penthetor lucasi) is a species of bat found in Brunei, Indonesia, Malaysia, and Singapore.

Dusky fruit bats are species found in Southeast Asia that serve as pollinators and seed dispersers in their ecosystem. Dusky fruit bats are considerably excellent seed dispersers due to their ability to travel long distances.
