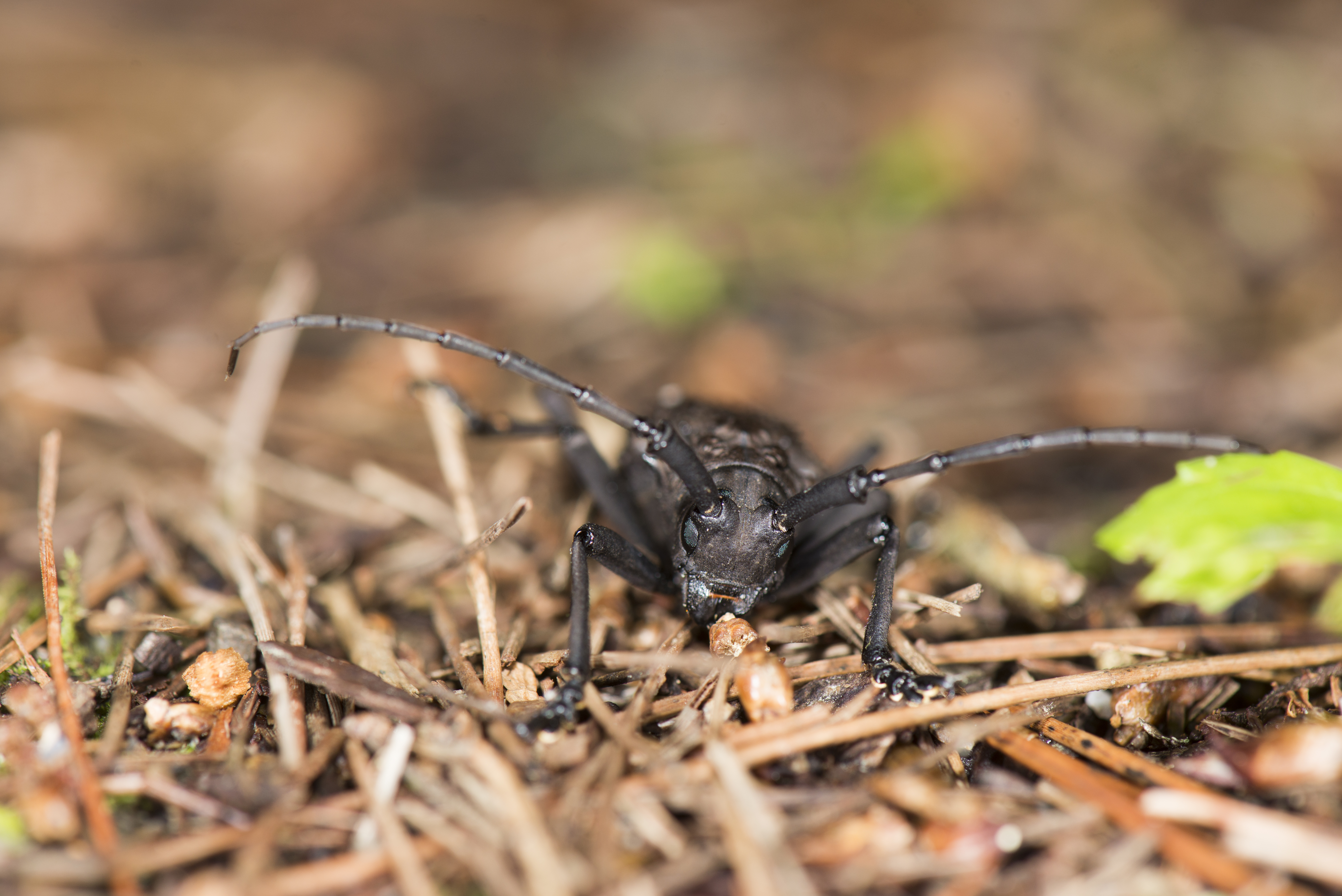

Scientific classification
- Kingdom: Animalia
- Phylum: Arthropoda
- Clade: Pancrustacea
- Class: Insecta
- Order: Coleoptera
- Suborder: Polyphaga
- Infraorder: Cucujiformia
- Family: Cerambycidae
- Genus: Aethalodes
- Species: A. verrucosus

Binomial name
- Aethalodes verrucosus Gahan, 1888

= Aethalodes =

Genus of beetles

Aethalodes verrucosus is a species of beetle in the family Cerambycidae, and the only species in the genus Aethalodes. It was described by Charles Joseph Gahan in 1888.

Subspecies Aethalodes verrucosus formosanus Kriesche, 1924 is endemic to Taiwan.
