= Pygmy fruit bat =

Pygmy Fruit Bat

Conservation status
- Least Concern (IUCN 3.1)

Scientific classification
- Kingdom: Animalia
- Phylum: Chordata
- Class: Mammalia
- Order: Chiroptera
- Family: Pteropodidae
- Genus: Aethalops
- Species: A. alecto

Binomial name
- Aethalops alecto (Thomas, 1923)
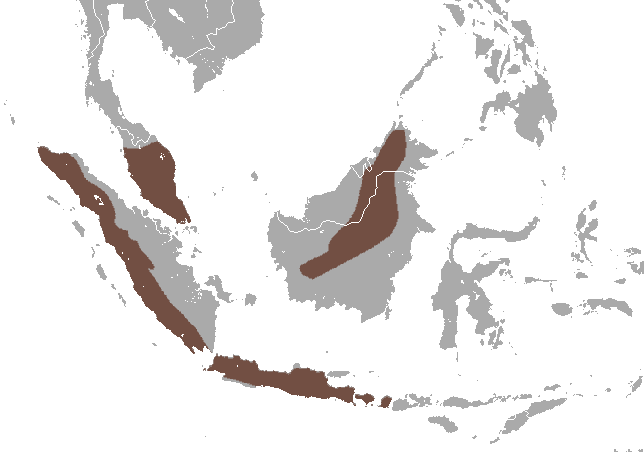
- Pygmy Fruit Bat range

Synonyms
- Aethalodes alecto Thomas, 1923

Species of bat

The pygmy fruit bat (Aethalops alecto), also known as the grey fruit bat, is a species of megabat.

== Distribution ==
Three specimens were collected in April 1995 from Bario highlands in Sarawak. A. alecto is confined to montane forest above 1000 m from Peninsular Malaysia, Sumatra and Java. In Borneo it had been recorded at Mount Kinabalu and Crocker Range in Sabah; Gunung Mulu and Bareo in Sarawak.

== Biology and ecology ==
Two adult females and an adult male collected from Bario were in a non-reproductive condition. Kitchener et al. (1990) reported a pregnant female collected on Lombok Island in October. Hill (1961) observed pregnancy in February and May in Peninsular Malaysia. Medway (1978) recorded that the months between February and June was the breeding period for the species. This species appears to be confined to montane forest above 1,000 m.
