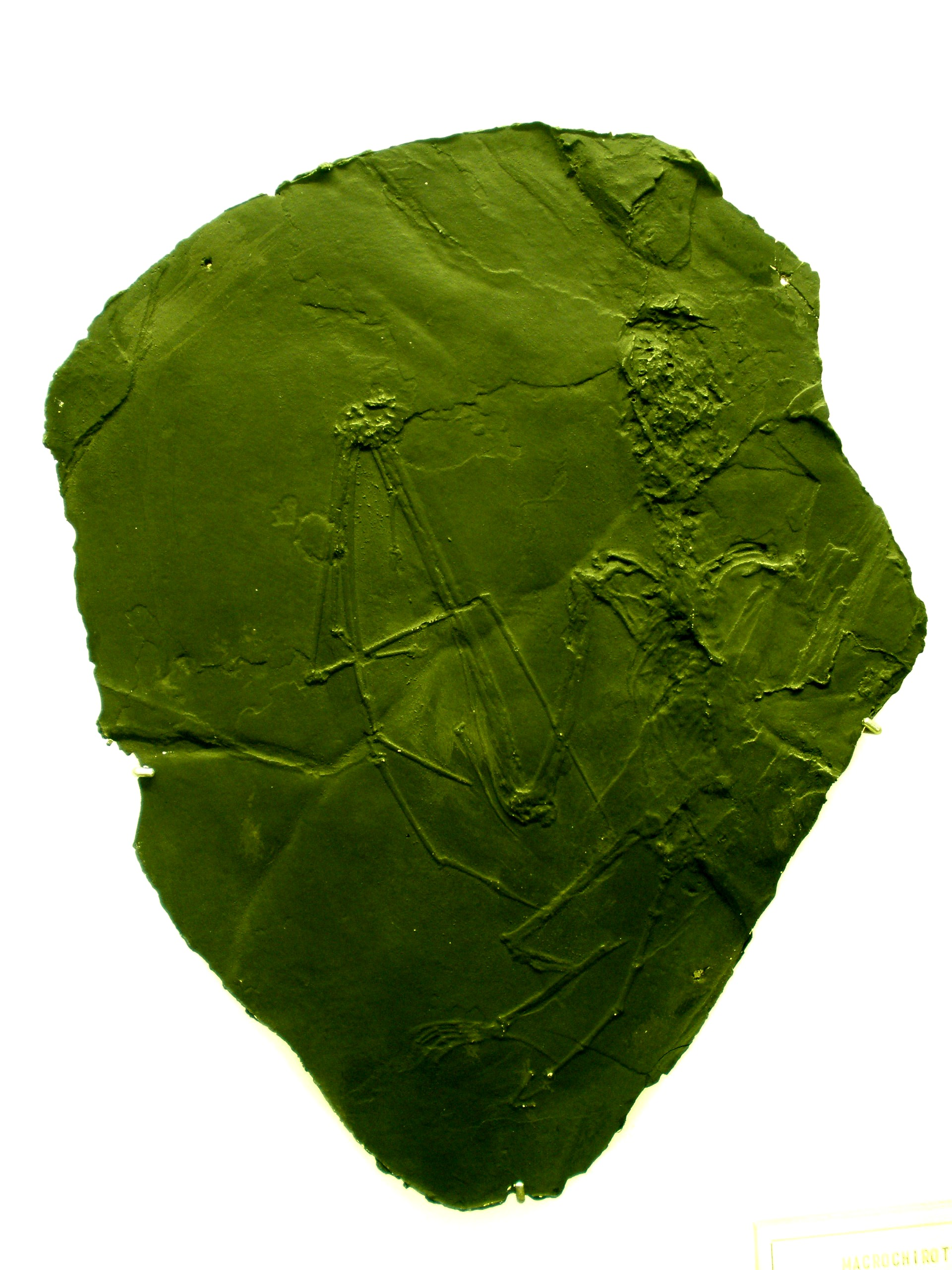
- Cast of holotype, Museo di Storia Naturale di Verona

Scientific classification
- Kingdom: Animalia
- Phylum: Chordata
- Class: Mammalia
- Order: Chiroptera
- Family: †Archaeopteropodidae; Simpson, 1945
- Genus: †Archaeopteropus; Meschinelli, 1903
- Species: †A. transiens

Binomial name
- †Archaeopteropus transiens Meschinelli, 1903

= Archaeopteropus =

Archaeopteropus Temporal range: Early Oligocene, 34–33 Ma

Extinct genus of bats

Archaeopteropus ("ancient Pteropus") is an extinct genus of large bat known from the Oligocene of Europe. It contains a single species, A. transiens, known from the Early Oligocene of Italy. It is the only member of the family Archaeopteropodidae (sometimes treated as the subfamily Archaeopteropodinae).

== Taxonomy ==
The taxonomy of Archaeopteropus has been contested since its description. As its name suggests, it was initially considered to be an ancient fruit bat related to the flying foxes (genus Pteropus). This would make it one of the oldest known fruit bats in the fossil record, and the only one known from an articulated fossil skeleton. Numerous lines of evidence have been used to validate this placement, including its very large size, broad plagiopatagium (wing membrane connecting the finger and legs), claw morphology, and long hindlimbs. However, Archaeopteropus also retains a bony calcar and a clawed third phalanx on the index finger, two traits which are only present in non-flying fox microbats. Thus, other studies have placed it as a stem-member of the microbat lineage that convergently evolved a fruit bat-like morphology.

== Description ==
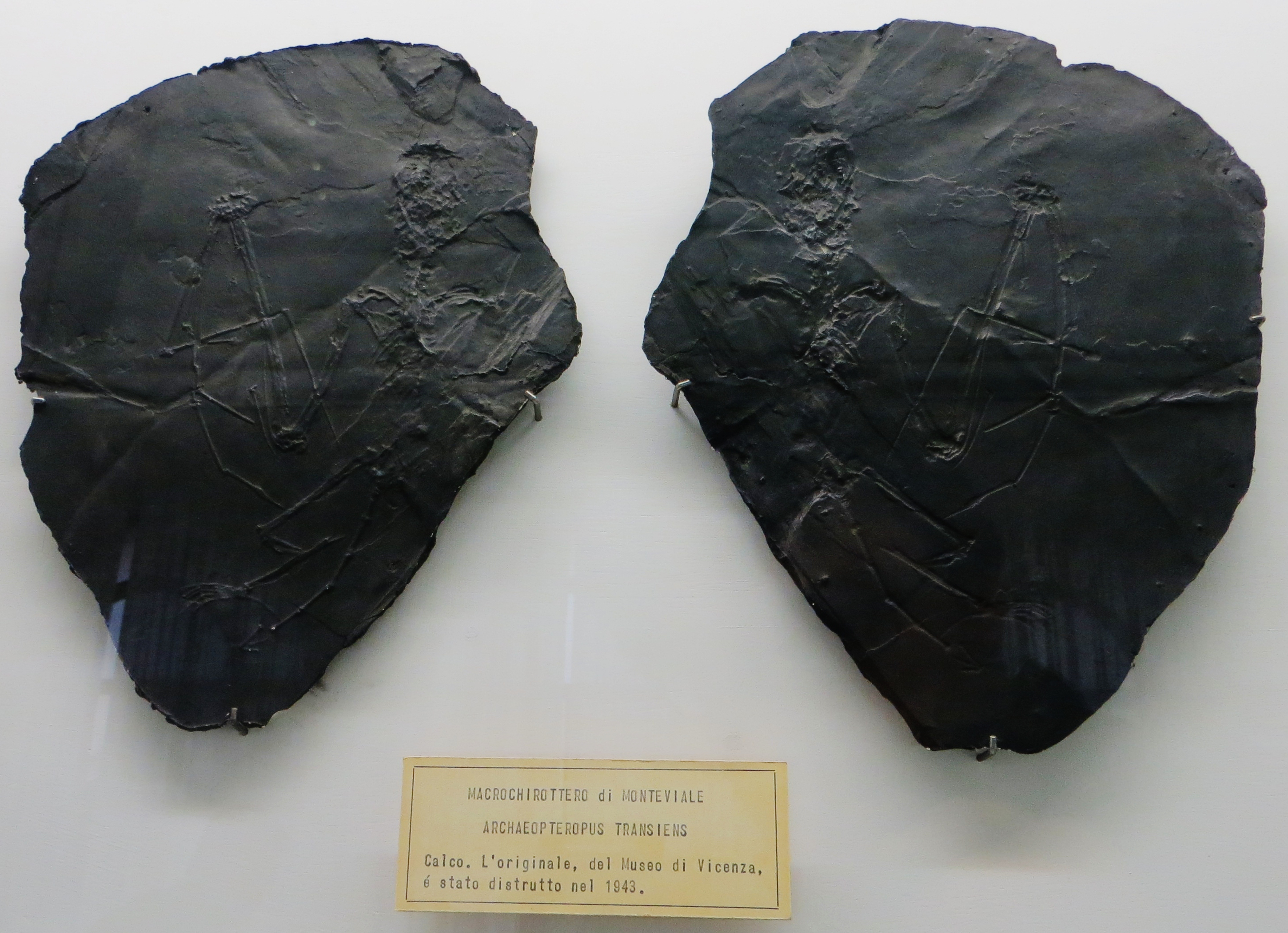
Cast of holotype slab and counterpart

With a total snout-to-tail length of 27.7 centimetres (0.91 ft) and an estimated extended wingspan of 82 to 90 centimetres (2.69 to 2.95 ft), Archaeopteropus is one of the largest known fossil bats, and the most completely known for its size. The diet of Archaeopteropus is uncertain due to the badly-crushed nature of the skull and dentition, although at least some of the few remaining teeth show morphology that appears to potentially reflect an insectivorous diet. However, its limb bones also show clear adaptations for a highly arboreal lifestyle of climbing trees, similar to modern fruit bats.

== Discovery ==
The only known specimen of Archaeopteropus, consisting of a partial articulated skeleton and counterpart, was described in 1903 and deposited at the Musei Civici Vicenza, where it was later destroyed during the bombing of Vicenza in World War II. However, prior to this, casts were made of the holotype specimens. All later studies of this genus are based on these casts and photographs of the holotype.

== Paleoecology ==
Archaeopteropus is known from the Monteviale fossil site, an lignite deposit near the town of the same name deposited at the very beginning of the Oligocene (immediately after the regional Grande Coupure faunal turnover), as part of the Castelgomberto Limestone formation. It is the most well-studied animal from this site, where it coexisted with other animals such as the rhinoceros Epiaceratherium and the hippopotamus relative Anthracotherium. This site appears to have been deposited in an estuarine environment, and is closely associated with the nearby sites of Monte Bolca despite its significantly younger age.
