= Australian flying fox die-offs =

Flying foxes dying during extreme heat events

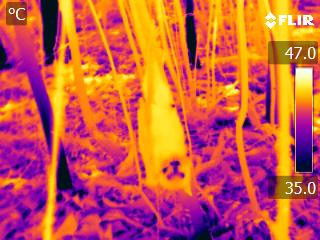
Thermal image of a juvenile grey-headed flying fox during an extreme temperature event

In the last two decades tens of thousands of Australian flying foxes have died during extreme heat events. Flying fox die-offs feature arguably among the most dramatic mass mortality events witnessed in nature, and can be indicators of heat stress in more cryptic fauna, where impacts are more difficult to assess. The die-offs are important additional threats to Australian flying-foxes and the ecosystem services they provide, and highlight the complex implications of climate change for behaviour, demography, and species survival.

== Impacts on species ==
Two Australian flying fox species have reportedly been affected by extreme heat events: the grey-headed flying fox (Pteropus poliocephalus) and the black flying fox (P. alecto). Where mixed-species colonies are affected the black flying fox suffers substantially higher mortality than the grey-headed flying fox. However, summer temperatures are more extreme within the range of the grey-headed flying fox than within the range of the black flying-fox, and therefore the actual total number of casualties is much higher among grey-headed flying foxes than black flying foxes. On occasion, the federally endangered spectacled flying fox (Pteropus conspicillatus) may be affected as well, further threatening the species in Australia.

== Impacts on demography ==
Mortality is especially high among dependent young and lactating females, but any demographic category can be affected.

== Impacts on behaviour ==
Observations in flying fox colonies during extreme heat events have revealed that flying foxes go through a predictable sequence of thermoregulatory behaviours with rising temperatures:

- wing-fanning
- shade-seeking and clustering
- panting
- salivation

Beyond this, individuals tend to be found near the bases of trees where they form piles of lethargic and dead bats.

== List of recorded Australian flying fox die-offs ==
Event	Date	State	Area	Number of camps affected	Minimum mortality estimate	Maximum mortality estimate	Species affected	Source
1	February 1791	NSW	Sydney				grey-headed flying fox	Tench 1793
2	December 1905	NSW	Helidon				grey-headed flying fox	Ratcliffe, 1932
3	January 1913	NSW	Mallanganee				grey-headed flying fox	Ratcliffe, 1932
4	January 1994	Qld	Townsville and Ipswich	2	1000		grey-headed flying fox, black flying fox	Welbergen et al., 2008
5	December 1994	NSW	Cabramatta and Gordon	2	6000	6000	grey-headed flying fox	Welbergen et al., 2008
6	late 1900s	NT		1	29	29	grey-headed flying fox	Tidemann & Nelson 2011
7	January 2000	Qld	Ipswich		500	500	grey-headed flying fox, black flying fox	Welbergen et al., 2008
8	12 January 2002	NSW	Murwillumbah	9	3679		grey-headed flying fox, black flying fox	Welbergen, Klose et al., 2008
9	January 2003	NSW	Cabramatta and Gordon	2	5000	5000	grey-headed flying fox	Welbergen et al., 2008
10	January 2004	NSW	Bellingen	1	3000	8000	grey-headed flying fox	Welbergen et al., 2008
11	December 2004	NSW	Coff's Harbour	2	1000	5000	grey-headed flying fox	Welbergen et al., 2008
12	December 2005	Qld, NSW, Vic		3	5613	8900	grey-headed flying fox, black flying fox	Welbergen et al., 2008
13	January 2006	NSW, Vic		6	4273	4843	grey-headed flying fox	Welbergen et al., 2008
14	December 2006 to January 2007	Vic	Melbourne	2	207	207	grey-headed flying fox	Welbergen et al., 2008
15	January 2014	Qld		>25	100000		grey-headed flying fox, black flying fox	Murphy 2014, Saunders 2014
16	November 2014	NSW	Casino and Richmond Valley	2	7000	7000	grey-headed flying fox, black flying fox	Godfrey 2014
17	November 2018	Qld			33000	40000	spectacled flying fox, black flying fox	
18	December 2019	Vic	Melbourne		4500		grey-headed flying fox	
