= Bombing of Vicenza in World War II =

Bombing of Vicenza
- Part of World War II
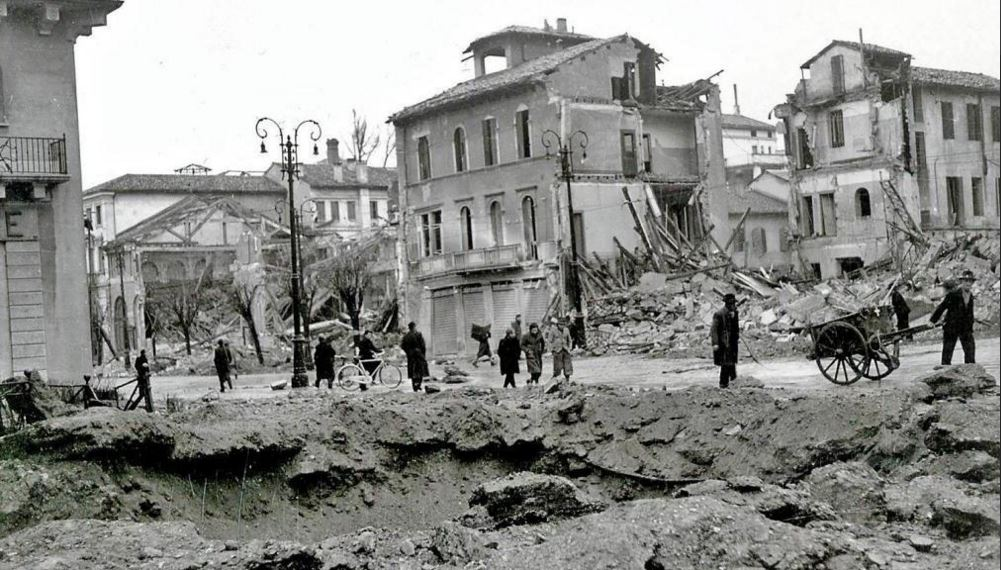
- A bomb-damaged street in Vicenza
Date	December 1943-April 1945
Location	Vicenza, Italy

Belligerents
United States; United Kingdom	Italian Social Republic

The bombing of Vicenza was a series of attacks by the United States Army Air Force and the Royal Air Force on the Italian city of Vicenza, Veneto, during World War II. The purpose of these raids was to disable the city's marshalling yard and airport, but the bombing also caused considerable collateral damage to the city itself.

== Chronology of the main air raids ==
=== 25 December 1943 ===
The first air raid on Vicenza. 20 bombers of the 15th Air Force attacked the airfield, but many bombs also fell on the city, hitting the San Bortolo and San Francesco districts, causing 31 victims among the population.

=== 28 December 1943 ===
Raid by 17 bombers of the 15th USAAF, targeting the marshalling yard. Part of the bombs fell on the southeastern districts of the city, causing 41 victims among the population.

=== 26 March 1944 ===
Raid by 78 RAF bombers, targeting the marshalling yard. Bombs also fell on the southern districts of the city, killing 14 civilians.

=== 2 April 1944 ===
Raid by fifty RAF bombers, targeting the marshalling yard. The city was hit as well (among other buildings, the psychiatric hospital suffered damage), causing the death of 26 civilians.

=== 14 May 1944 ===
Raid by 150 bombers of the 15th U.S. Air Force, which dropped 1,300 bombs, targeting the marshalling yard. Many bombs fell on the city, causing heavy damage to the cultural heritage and killing 56 civilians.

=== 17 November 1944 ===
Raid by 38 RAF bombers, which dropped 106 tons of bombs over the airfield. Five civilians were also killed.

=== 18 November 1944 ===
Raid by the USAAF; 304 tons of bombs were dropped, targeting the air base. This was the bloodiest raid suffered by Vicenza: deaths among the population numbered at least 317 (according to official figures), but some estimates place this number at 500.

=== 4 January 1945 ===
Raid by the USAAF, targeting the marshalling yard. Two deaths among the population.

=== 28 February 1945 ===
Raid by the 15th U.S. Air Force, targeting the marshalling yard. The city was also hit, with sixteen victims among the civilians.

=== 18 March 1945 ===
Raid by 73 RAF bombers, targeting the marshalling yard. Bombs also fell on the city, setting fire to the roof of the Basilica Palladiana and causing five civilian deaths.

=== 26 and 28 April 1945 ===
The last two air raids on Vicenza caused thirty-four deaths among the population.

== Damage and casualties ==
The raids caused heavy damage to the urban fabric of Vicenza. In addition to homes and public buildings, many landmarks suffered serious damage: among them the Cathedral, the churches of San Gaetano and Santa Corona, the Basilica Palladiana, the Arco delle Scalette, the Palazzo Valmarana and several other churches (such as the Basilica of Saints Felice and Fortunato) and historic palaces (such as the Ca’ d’Oro). The Verdi and Eretenio theatres were destroyed and never rebuilt.

Casualties among the civilian population from the air raids numbered about one thousand victims (other sources claim that there were 2,000 deaths).
