= Reproductive technology =

Uses of technology in human and animal reproduction

Reproductive technology encompasses all current and anticipated uses of technology in human and animal reproduction, including assisted reproductive technology (ART), contraception and others. It is also termed Assisted Reproductive Technology, where it entails an array of appliances and procedures that enable the realization of safe, improved and healthier reproduction. While this is not true of all people, for most married couples, the ability to have children is vital. But through the technology, infertile couples have been provided with options that would allow them to conceive children.

== Overview ==
=== Assisted reproductive technology ===
Assisted reproductive technology (ART) is the use of reproductive technology to treat low fertility or infertility. Modern technology can provide infertile couples with assisted reproductive technologies. The natural method of reproduction has become only one of many new techniques used today. There are millions of couples that do not have the ability to reproduce on their own because of infertility and therefore, must resort to these new techniques. The main causes of infertility are that of hormonal malfunctions and anatomical abnormalities. ART is currently the only form of assistance for individuals who, for the time being, can only conceive through surrogacy methods). Examples of ART include in vitro fertilization (IVF) and its possible expansions, including:

- artificial insemination
- artificial reproduction
- cloning (see human cloning for the special case of human beings)
- cytoplasmic transfer
- cryopreservation of sperm, oocytes, embryos
- embryo transfer
- fertility medication
- hormone treatment
- in vitro fertilization
- intracytoplasmic sperm injection
- in vitro generated gametes
- preimplantation genetic diagnosis

=== Role of the Society for Assisted Reproductive Technology (SART) ===
In 1981, after the birth of Elizabeth Carr, the first baby in the United States to be conceived through in vitro fertilization (IVF). Her birth gave hope to many couples struggling with infertility. Dr. Howard Jones brought together the leading practitioners of the five US-based IVF programs (Norfolk, Vanderbilt, University of Texas at Houston, and the University of Southern California, Yale) to discuss the establishment of a national registry for in vitro fertilization attempts and outcomes. 2 years later, in 1985 the Society for assisted reproductive technology (SART) was founded as a special interest entity within the American Fertility Society. SART has not only informed the evolution of infertility care but also improved success of antiretroviral therapy.

=== Prognostics ===
Reproductive technology can inform family planning by providing individual prognoses regarding the likelihood of pregnancy. It facilitates the monitoring of ovarian reserve, follicular dynamics and associated biomarkers in females, as well as semen analysis in males.

=== Contraception ===
Contraception, also known as birth control, is a form of reproductive technology that enables people to prevent pregnancy. There are many forms of contraception, but the term covers any method or device which is intended to prevent pregnancy in a sexually active woman. Methods are intended to "prevent the fertilization of an egg or implantation of a fertilized egg in the uterus." Different forms of birth control have been around since ancient times, but widely available effective and safe methods only became available during the mid-1900s.

=== Others ===
The following reproductive techniques are not currently in routine clinical use; most are still undergoing development:

- artificial wombs
- germinal choice technology
- in vitro parthenogenesis
- reprogenetics

==== Same-sex procreation ====
Research is currently investigating the possibility of same-sex procreation, which would produce offspring with equal genetic contributions from either two females or two males. This form of reproduction has become a possibility through the creation of either female sperm (containing the genetic material of a female) or male eggs (containing the genetic material of a male). Same-sex procreation would remove the need for lesbian and gay couples to rely on a third party donation of a sperm or an egg for reproduction. The first significant development occurred in 1991, in a patent application filed by U.Penn. scientists to fix male sperm by extracting some sperm, correcting a genetic defect in vitro, and injecting the sperm back into the male's testicles. While the vast majority of the patent application dealt with male sperm, one line suggested that the procedure would work with XX cells, i.e., cells from an adult woman to make female sperm.

In the two decades that followed, the idea of female sperm became more of a reality. In 1997, scientists partially confirmed such techniques by creating chicken female sperm in a similar manner. They did so by injecting blood stem cells from an adult female chicken into a male chicken's testicles. In 2004, other Japanese scientists created two female offspring by combining the eggs of two adult mice.

In 2008, research was done specifically for methods on creating human female sperm using artificial or natural Y chromosomes and testicular transplantation. A UK-based group predicted they would be able to create human female sperm within five years. So far no conclusive successes have been achieved.

In 2018 Chinese research scientists produced 29 viable mice offspring from two mother mice by creating sperm-like structures from haploid Embryonic stem cells using gene editing to alter imprinted regions of DNA. They were unable to get viable offspring from two fathers. Experts noted that there was little chance of these techniques being applied to humans in the near future.

== Ethics ==
Recent technological advances in fertility treatments introduce ethical problems, such as the affordability of the various procedures. The exorbitant prices can limit who has access. The cost of performing ART per live birth varies among countries. The average cost per IVF cycle in the United States is USD 9,266. However, the cost per live birth for autologous ART treatment cycles in the United States, Canada, and the United Kingdom ranged from approximately USD 33,000 to 41,000 compared to USD 24,000 to 25,000 in Scandinavia, Japan, and Australia

The funding structure for IVF/ART is highly variable among different nations. For example, no federal government reimbursement exists for IVF in the United States, although certain states have insurance mandates for ART

Many issues of reproductive technology have given rise to bioethical issues, since technology often alters the assumptions that lie behind existing systems of sexual and reproductive morality. Other ethical considerations arise with the application of ART to women of advanced maternal age, who have higher changes of medical complications (including pre-eclampsia), and possibly in the future its application to post-menopausal women. Also, ethical issues of human enhancement arise when reproductive technology has evolved to be a potential technology for not only reproductively inhibited people but even for otherwise re-productively healthy people.

== In fiction ==
- Films and other fiction depicting contemporary emotional struggles of assisted reproductive technology have had an upswing first in the latter part of the 2000s decade, although the techniques have been available for decades.
- Science fiction has tackled the themes of creating life through non-conventional methods since Mary Shelley's Frankenstein. In the 20th century, Aldous Huxley's Brave New World (1932) was the first major fictional work to anticipate the possible social consequences of reproductive technology. Its largely negative view was reversed when the author revisited the same themes in his utopian final novel, Island (1962).
