= Male pregnancy =

Pregnancy in males

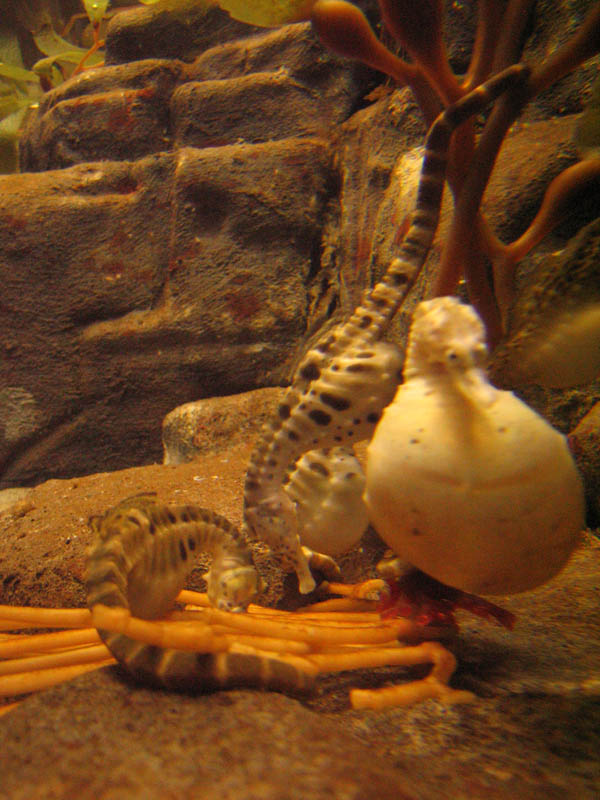
Pregnant male seahorse

Male pregnancy is the incubation of one or more embryos or fetuses by organisms of the male sex in some species. Most species that reproduce by sexual reproduction are heterogamous—females producing larger gametes (ova) and males producing smaller gametes (sperm). In nearly all animal species that give live birth, offspring are carried by the female until birth, but in fish of the family Syngnathidae (pipefish, seahorses and the leafy seadragon), males perform that function.

== In animals ==
=== Syngnathidae family ===
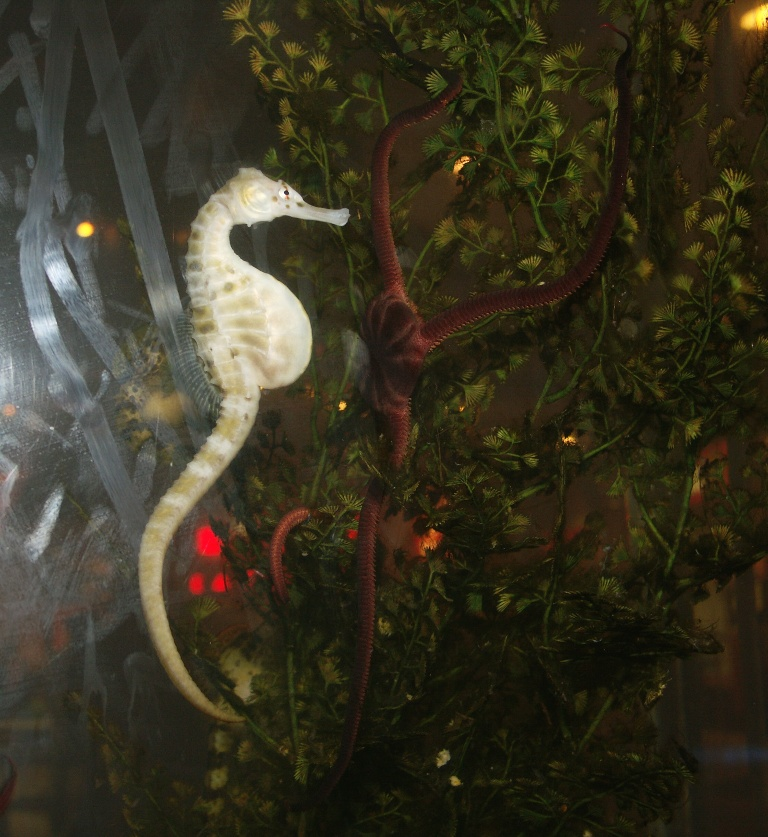
Pregnant male seahorse

The fish family Syngnathidae has the unique characteristic of a highly derived form of male brood care referred to as "male pregnancy". The family is highly diverse, containing around 300 different species of fish. Included in Syngnathidae are seahorses, the pipefish, and the weedy and leafy seadragons. The males of some of these species possess a brood pouch on the trunk or tail; in other species, the eggs are merely attached to the male's trunk or tail when the female lays them. Although biologists' definitions of pregnancy somewhat differ, all members of the family are considered by ichthyologists to display male pregnancy, even those without an external brood pouch.

Fertilization may take place in the pouch or in the water before implantation, but in either case, syngnathids' male pregnancy ensures them complete confidence of paternity. After implantation in or on the brood pouch or brood patch, the male incubates the eggs. Many species osmoregulate the brood pouch fluid to maintain a suitable pH level for the developing embryos. In at least some species, the male also provisions his offspring with nutrients such as glucose and amino acids through the highly vascularized attachment sites in or on his body.

This period of incubation can take much longer than the production of another clutch of eggs by the female, especially in temperate regions where pregnancies last longer, leading to a reproductive environment in which sexual selection can be stronger on females than on males due to increased male parental investment. This reversal of usual sex roles has only been found in pipefishes, whereas seahorses have largely been accepted as monogamous. Some pipefish species display classical polyandry because of this unique situation. Male syngnathids usually prefer females with large body size and prominent ornaments such as blue skin pigmentation or skin folds. Syngnathid males in some species are apparently capable of absorbing eggs or embryos while in the brood pouch. In these cases, embryos with the highest survival rate are those whose mothers display the preferred phenotype.

Syngnathidae is the only family in the animal kingdom to which the term "male pregnancy" has been applied.

=== Other animals ===
In 2021, Chinese researchers at the Naval Medical University in Shanghai published a preprint of a study that attempted to impregnate male rats, using parabiosis with female rats. Each male rat was castrated, surgically joined to a female, and given a transplanted uterus. The researchers then implanted embryos in both the uterus of the male and female parabionts. Pregnancies were allowed to develop until two days before the end of a full term, and were terminated by caesarean section. The researchers studied 46 such parabiotic pairs. In over half of the pairs, neither the male nor female became pregnant with normal embryos; in about one-third of the pairs, only the female became thus pregnant; and in six pairs, both the female and male became pregnant. There were no pairs in which only the male parabiont rat became pregnant. The study attracted much attention and controversy, with some researchers questioning the utility of such research, and others raising questions of bioethics issues.

In 2023, Japanese scientists used skin cells from 2 male mice to create eggs and fathered a litter of seven babies. The eggs were implanted in surrogate female mice. The current downside is the success rate is 1% (7 mice were born out of 630 attempts). This milestone in reproductive biology was published in British scientific journal Nature, cultivating the idea of more reproductive possibilities in the future. The team was led by developmental biologist Katsuhiko Hayashi of the Osaka and Kyushu universities.

== In humans ==
=== Ectopic implant ===
Protest organized by women saying that men can not get pregnant, 2026

Mammalian males, including humans, do not possess a uterus to gestate offspring. The theoretical issue of male ectopic pregnancy (pregnancy outside the uterine cavity) by surgical implantation has been addressed by experts in the field of fertility medicine, who stress that the concept of ectopic implantation, while theoretically plausible, has never been attempted and would be difficult to justify – even for a woman lacking a uterus – owing to the extreme health risks to both the parent and child.

Robert Winston, a pioneer of in-vitro fertilization, told London's Sunday Times that "male pregnancy would certainly be possible" by having an embryo implanted in a man's abdomen – with the placenta attached to an internal organ such as the bowel – and later delivered surgically. Ectopic implantation of the embryo along the abdominal wall, and resulting placenta growth would, however, be very dangerous and potentially fatal for the host, and is therefore unlikely to be studied in humans. Gillian Lockwood, medical director of Midland Fertility Services, a British fertility clinic, noted that the abdomen has not evolved to separate from the placenta during delivery, hence the danger of an ectopic pregnancy. Bioethicist Glenn McGee said "the question is not 'Can a man do it?'. It's 'If a man does have a successful [ectopic] pregnancy, can he survive it?'"

Since 2000, several hoax websites have appeared on the Internet purporting to describe the world's first pregnant man. While some rely on legitimate scientific claims, no such experiment has ever been reported. Fertility clinician Cecil Jacobson claimed to have transplanted a fertilized egg from a female baboon to the omentum in the abdominal cavity of a male baboon in the mid-1960s, which then carried the fetus for four months; however, Jacobson did not publish his claims in a scientific journal, and was subsequently convicted on several unrelated counts of fraud for ethical misconduct.

=== Uterus transplantation ===
Transplanting a uterus into a male body poses a challenge due to the lack of natural ligaments, vasculature, and hormones required to support the uterus. The uterus would either have to be donated by a willing donor or be tissue-engineered using the male's stem cells and then implanted into the pelvic region. Afterward, an in vitro fertilisation (IVF) procedure would be followed to insert the embryo into the male's transplanted womb.

In 1931, Lili Elbe, a trans woman, underwent a uterus transplant in an attempt to achieve pregnancy, but died of complications following the procedure.

=== Pregnancy in transgender men ===
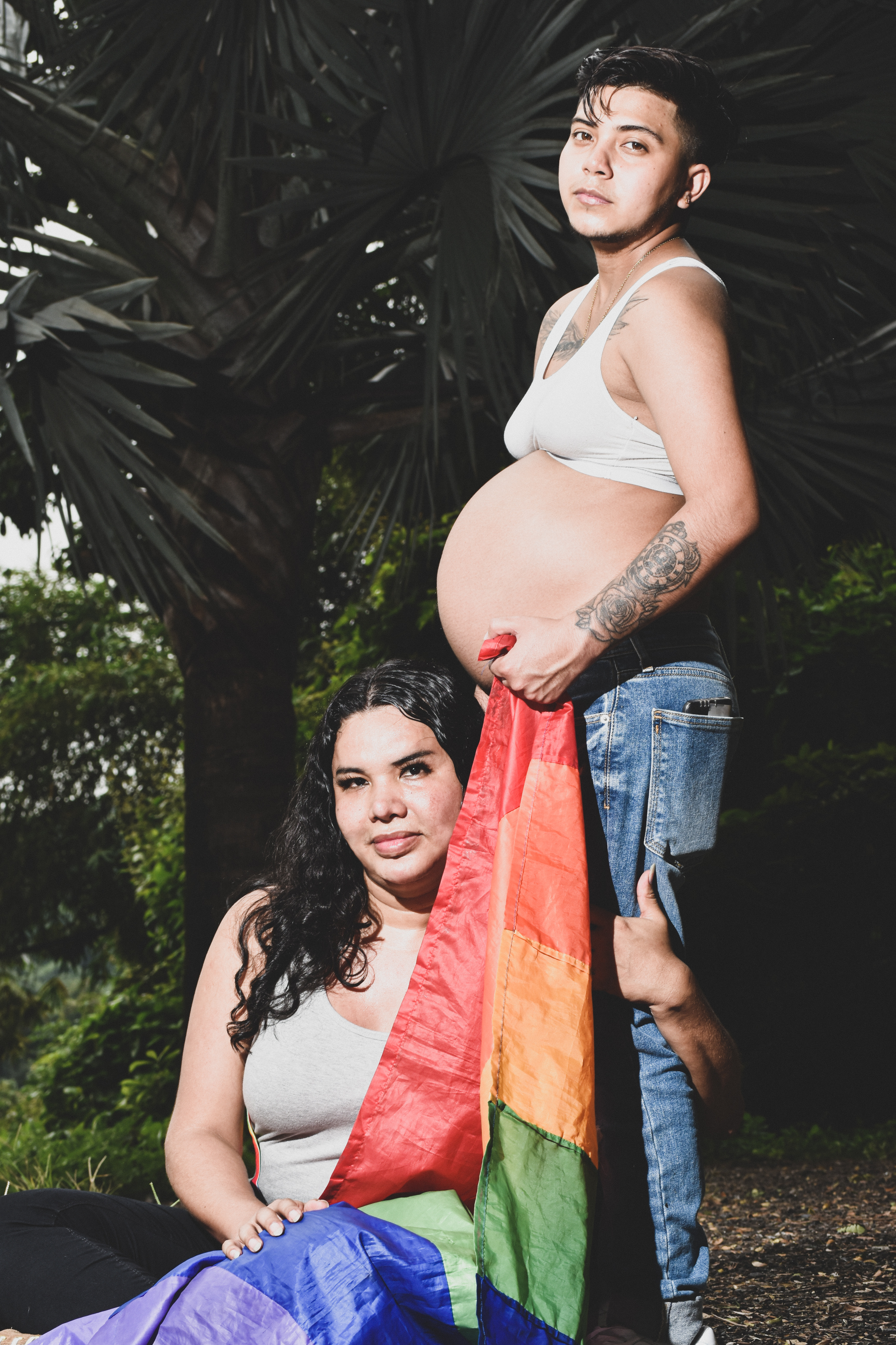
Pregnant trans man Zack Elías and his transgender wife, Diane Rodríguez, 2021

Some transgender men choose to become pregnant or wish to preserve their fertility. Those with functioning ovaries and a uterus can become pregnant. Masculinizing hormone therapy reduces fertility and stops the menstrual cycle, but is not considered an effective contraceptive—trans men taking testosterone may still become pregnant even if their periods have stopped. Trans men who undergo some masculinizing surgeries, including hysterectomy (removal of the uterus) and bilateral salpingo-oopherectomy (removal of both ovaries) are infertile.

== In popular culture ==
=== Religious texts ===
Hindu religious texts, such as the Mahabharata (composition range from 300 BCE to 400 CE) and the Vishnu Purana (composition range from 400 BCE to 900 CE), contain the story of King Yuvanashva, who accidentally becomes pregnant by drinking a sacred potion intended for his queens. He proceeds with the pregnancy and his son, Mandhata, goes on to become a king renowned for his greatness, benevolence, and generosity.

In ancient Greek religion and myth, a version of Dionysus' birth (known in mainland Greece after 500 BCE, popularized in 500 CE), claims that Dionysus was sewn into Zeus' thigh. "So the rounded thigh in labour became female, and the boy too soon born was brought forth, but not in a mother's way, having passed from a mother's womb to a father's." Athena was believed to have been born from the forehead of her father Zeus. The earliest mention is in Book V of the Iliad (c. 800 BCE), when Ares accuses Zeus of being biased in favor of Athena because "autos egeinao" (literally "you fathered her", but probably intended as "you gave birth to her").

In the 1994 movie Junior, Dr. Alexander "Alex" Hesse, played by Arnold Schwarzenegger, agrees to undergo a male pregnancy and is depicted giving birth in the film.

Virgil Wong, a performance artist, created a hoax site featuring a fictitious male pregnancy, claiming to detail the pregnancy of his friend Lee Mingwei.

Male pregnancy as a trope in fan fiction―called mpreg―is also commonly explored in hentai, the subgenre of speculative erotic fiction known as the Omegaverse, and slash (homosexual) fan fiction, usually based upon fantasy series such as Supernatural, Harry Potter, and video game series such as Sonic the Hedgehog.

In 2021, Unicode approved the "pregnant man" and "pregnant person" emojis in version 14.0, and added to Emoji 14.0. However, this came with some controversy, as some viewed it to be "absurd".

== See also ==
- Allotransplantation, transplanting of non-native tissue
- Artificial uterus (extracorporeal gestation)
- Couvade, a ritual
- Couvade syndrome, a sympathetic condition
- Female sperm
- Male egg
- Male lactation
- Male menstruation
- Mpreg
- Simulated pregnancy
- Thomas Beatie
- Trystan Reese
- Transgender pregnancy
