= Male lactation =

Production of milk in male mammals

Production of milk (lactation) from a male mammal's mammary glands is well-documented in the dayak fruit bat and the Bismarck masked flying fox. The term "male lactation" is not used in human medicine. It has been used in popular literature, such as Louise Erdrich's The Antelope Wife, to describe the phenomenon of male galactorrhea, which is a human condition unrelated to childbirth or nursing. Newborn babies of both sexes can occasionally produce milk. This is called neonatal milk (also known as "witch's milk") and not considered male lactation.

== History ==
Male lactation was of some interest to Alexander von Humboldt, who reports in Voyage aux régions équinoxiales du Nouveau Continent about a citizen of the Venezuelan village of Arenas (close to Cumana) who allegedly nurtured his son for three months when his wife was ill, as well as Charles Darwin, who commented on it in The Descent of Man, and Selection in Relation to Sex (1871):

It is well known that in the males of all mammals, including man, rudimentary mammae exist. These in several instances have become well developed, and have yielded a copious supply of milk. Their essential identity in the two sexes is likewise shown by their occasional sympathetic enlargement in both during an attack of the measles.

Darwin later considered the nearly perfect function of male nipples in contrast to greatly reduced structures such as the vesicula prostatica, speculating that both sexes may have nursed young in early mammalian ancestors, and subsequently mammals evolved to inactivate them in males at an early age.

== Evolution and biology ==
Male mammals of many species have been observed to lactate under unusual or pathogenic conditions, such as extreme stress, castration, and exposure to phytoestrogens, or pituitary tumors. Therefore, it is hypothesized that while most male mammals could easily develop the ability to lactate, there is no selective advantage to male lactation. While male mammals could, in theory, improve their offspring's survival rate through the additional nourishment provided by lactation, most have developed other strategies to increase the number of surviving offspring, such as mating with additional partners. Presently, very few species are known where male lactation occurs and it is not well understood what evolutionary factors control the development of this trait.

== Nonhuman animal male lactation ==
The phenomenon of male lactation occurs in some species, notably the dayak fruit bat (Dyacopterus spadiceus), lesser short-nosed fruit bat (Cynopterus brachyotis), and the Bismarck masked flying fox (Pteropus capistratus). Lactating males may assist in the nursing of their infants. In addition, male goats are known to lactate on occasion.

There is evidence that castrated male cows may lactate.

== Human male lactation ==
Spontaneous production of milk not associated with childbirth, known as galactorrhea, can occur in human males and females. Case reports of lactation induced in transgender women have been published.

== See also ==
- Galactagogue
- Intersex
- LGBT reproduction
- Milking the bull, a proverb that refers to the act of milking a male animal
- Male egg
- Male pregnancy
