= Cecil Brooks =

Cecil Brooks may refer to:

- Cecil Brooks III (born 1959), American jazz drummer and record producer
- Cecil Joslin Brooks (1875–1953), British metallurgical chemist and collector of plants, animals and butterflies
