= Brooks's dyak fruit bat =

Conservation status
- Vulnerable (IUCN 3.1)

Scientific classification
- Kingdom: Animalia
- Phylum: Chordata
- Class: Mammalia
- Order: Chiroptera
- Family: Pteropodidae
- Genus: Dyacopterus
- Species: D. brooksi

Binomial name
- Dyacopterus brooksi Thomas, 1920
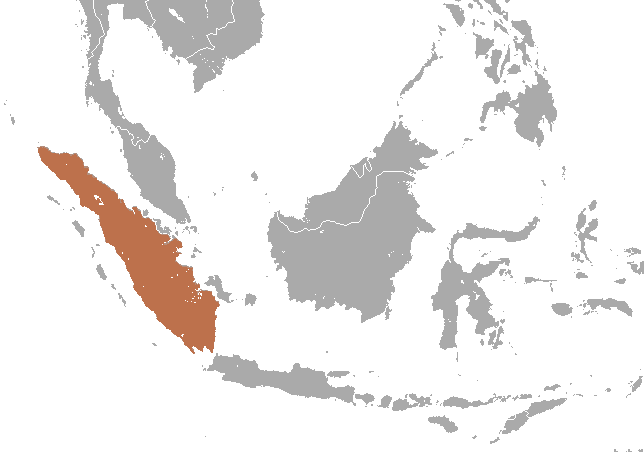
- Brooks's dyak fruit bat range

Species of bat

Brooks's dyak fruit bat (Dyacopterus brooksi) is a species of megabat in the family Pteropodidae endemic to Sumatra. It was formerly included as a subspecies of the dayak fruit bat.

== Taxonomy and etymology ==
Brooks's dyak fruit bat was described as a new species in 1920 by British mammalogist Oldfield Thomas. He placed it in the genus Dyacopterus with a scientific name of Dyacopterus brooksi. It is named for Cecil Joslin Brooks, who collected the type specimen near the village of Lebong Tandai on the island of Sumatra and presented it to Thomas.

In later publications, it was sometimes considered synonymous with or a subspecies of the Dayak fruit bat, D. spadiceus. A 2007 principal component analysis based on skull and body dimensions showed that D. brooksi and D. spadiceus clustered separately

== Description ==
The Brooks's dyak fruit bat has a forearm length of 81–83 mm (3.2–3.3 in). The genus Dyacopterus has fruit bats that are considered small or medium-sized, weighing less than 150 g (5.3 oz). It has a short tail, grayish brown fur on its back, and silvery gray fur on its belly. The flight membranes attach to the second toe. It has a dental formula of 2.1.2.12.1.3.2 for a total of 28 teeth.

== Range and habitat ==
The Brooks's dyak fruit bat is endemic to Indonesia. Its range includes Sumatra and possibly Kalimantan on the island of Borneo. Its habitat preferences are poorly understood but it has been found in mature and secondary lowland forests.
