= Milking the bull =

Proverb indicating a fruitless task

The proverb illustrated on a playing card in about 1535 by Hans Schäufelein.

Milking the bull is a proverb which uses the metaphor of milking a bull to indicate that an activity would be fruitless or futile.

In the 16th century, the German painter Hans Schäufelein illustrated the proverb on the eight of bells in a deck of playing cards.

Dr Johnson used the proverb to criticise the work of David Hume and other skeptical philosophers.

== See also ==
- Tilting at windmills
- Male lactation
- Collection of semen from bulls
