= Rickart's dyak fruit bat =

Conservation status
- Endangered (IUCN 3.1)

Scientific classification
- Kingdom: Animalia
- Phylum: Chordata
- Class: Mammalia
- Order: Chiroptera
- Family: Pteropodidae
- Genus: Dyacopterus
- Species: D. rickarti

Binomial name
- Dyacopterus rickarti Helgen et al., 2007
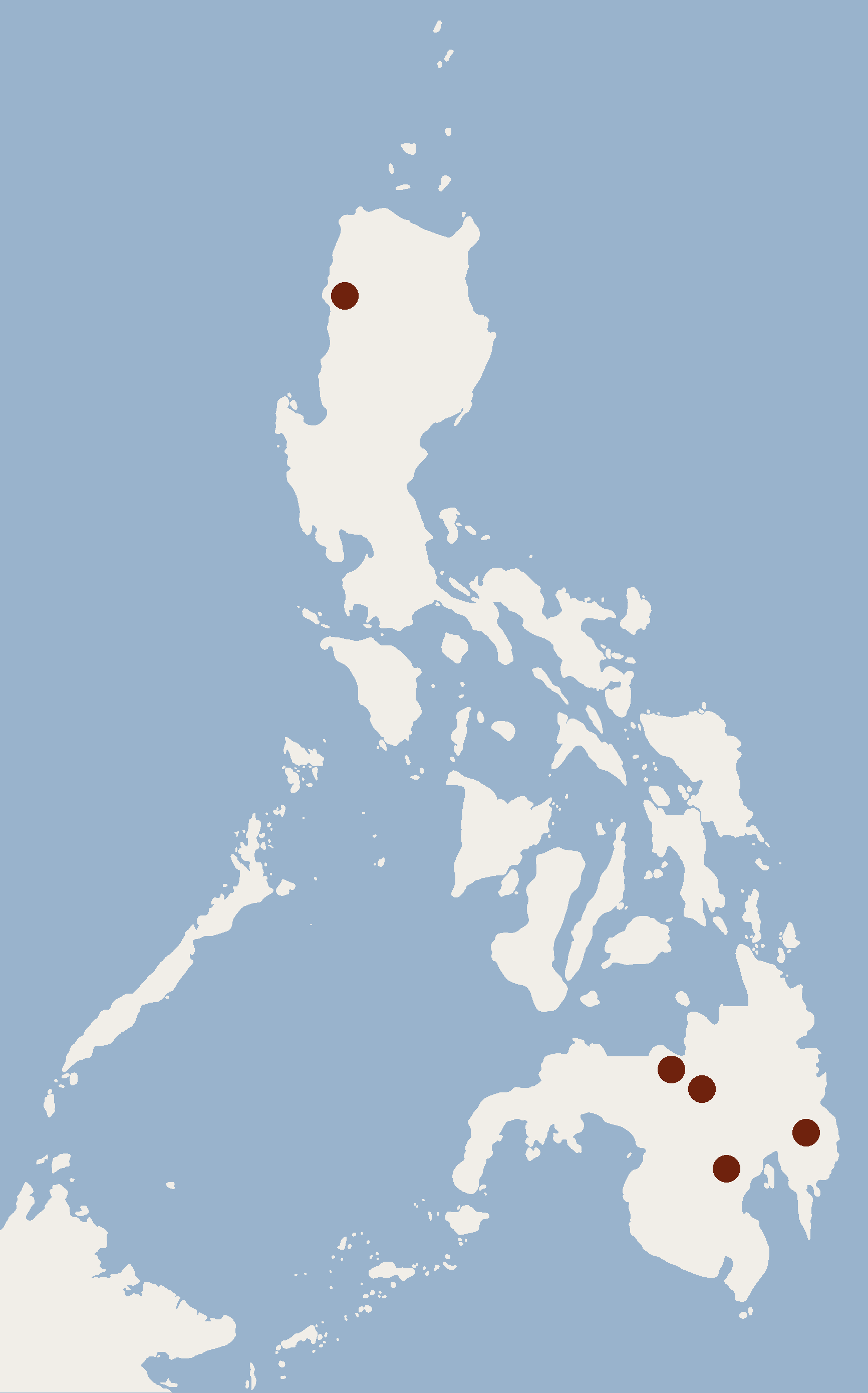

Species of bat

Rickart's dyak fruit bat (Dyacopterus rickarti) is a species of megabat in the family Pteropodidae found on Luzon and Mindanao islands, in the Philippines.
