= Thomas Beatie =

Speaker, author, and transgender advocate

- Beatie at Stockholm Pride 2011
- Born: 1974 (age 51–52); Oahu, Hawaii, United States
- Spouses: Nancy Gillespie (m. 2003; div. 2012) Amber Nicholas (m. 2016)
- Children: 4
- Website: definenormal.com

Thomas Trace Beatie (born 1974) is an American public speaker, author, and advocate of transgender rights and sexuality issues, with a focus on transgender fertility and reproductive rights.

Beatie came out as a trans man in early 1997. Beatie had gender-affirming surgery in March 2002 and became known as "the pregnant man" after he became pregnant through artificial insemination in 2007. Beatie chose to be pregnant, with donated sperm, because his wife Nancy was sterile.

The couple filed for divorce in 2012. The Beatie case is the first of its kind on record, where a documented legal male gave birth within a marriage to a woman, and for the first time, a court challenged a marriage where the husband gave birth.

== Early life ==
Thomas Beatie was assigned female at birth and grew up in Honolulu as the first of two children. His mother, Susan Nickels Beatie, was born in Minnesota. His father, of Korean and Filipino descent, was born and raised in Hawaii. He is related to two former U.S. presidents: William Henry Harrison, his fifth great-grandfather, and Benjamin Harrison, his third great uncle.

As a teenager, Thomas was a model and Miss Hawaii Teen USA pageant finalist. He competed in karate and Taekwondo, winning a junior championship in Taekwondo forms in the 1992 Aloha State Games. He graduated from the University of Hawaii in 1996 with a bachelor's degree in health science and later pursued an Executive MBA.

== Gender transition and pregnancies ==
Beatie underwent sex reassignment surgery involving a double mastectomy, also known as "top surgery", and officially changed his sex marker from "female" to "male" on his state and federal identity documents in 2002. However, he retained his female reproductive organs, which later allowed him to become pregnant.

Beatie married Nancy Gillespie in 2003. The couple moved to Bend, Oregon, in 2005. When the two decided to have children, Beatie chose to carry the child, since Nancy was unable due to a prior hysterectomy. Beatie suspended testosterone hormone treatment in order to conceive but the first conception was an ectopic pregnancy with triplets that was life-threatening, requiring a surgical intervention, loss of his right fallopian tube and the embryos. He became successfully pregnant afterwards, twice with donor sperm, delivering both children without complications. Beatie delivered his first child in June 2008.

Beatie stated that he felt no conflict between his pregnancy and his gender as a man, saying that he considered himself the child's father and his wife Nancy the mother. He gave birth to his second child, a son, in 2009. The couple's third child, a second son, was born in July 2010. Beatie later elected to have "lower" surgery, including the creation of a functional penis. The procedure, performed by transgender surgeon Marci Bowers, was documented on his second appearance of The Doctors, in 2012. The procedure, called a ring metoidioplasty, included transfer of tissue, elongation of the hormonally enlarged phallus, as well as urethral construction and lengthening.

== Media attention ==
Beatie received intense media attention after he wrote a first-person article in the national LGBT magazine The Advocate in 2008. In it, Beatie described the prejudice he and Nancy faced after deciding to have a child, writing:

Doctors have discriminated against us, turning us away due to their religious beliefs. Health care professionals have refused to call me by a male pronoun or recognize Nancy as my wife. Receptionists have laughed at us. Friends and family have been unsupportive; most of Nancy's family doesn't even know I'm transgender."

The article was accompanied by a shirtless photograph of the pregnant Beatie, which became an object of voyeurism among the public according to the queer theorist Jack Halberstam. Within weeks of the online publication, news of his story quickly spread through national and international media, who dubbed Beatie "the pregnant man".

Beatie made his first television appearance, an hour-long exclusive interview, on the Oprah Winfrey Show in April 2008. During the show, he talked about his sense of reproductive right to bear a child independent of his male gender identity. He commented, "It's not a male or female desire to want to have a child [...] it's a human desire [...] I'm a person, and I have the right to have my own biological child." The Oprah episode received a spike in Nielsen ratings. The same month, Beatie was profiled in a six-page story in People, with photography by Mary Ellen Mark.

Multiple tabloids as well as mainstream news outlets reported the story, after paparazzi captured images of the family leaving the St. Charles Medical Center in Bend, Oregon days later. People's senior editor, Patrick Rogers, gave an interview to the CBS Early Morning Show about the birth. An August 2008 issue of People featured Beatie with his daughter, sharing the cover with a larger image of presidential candidate Barack Obama posing with his family.

Journalist Barbara Walters announced on The View in November 2008 that Thomas was expecting his second child. The next day, ABC aired an interview with the Beaties on 20/20 titled "Journey of a Pregnant Man". During the interview, Walters showed a series of photographs of Beatie, commenting on the "disturbing" nature of the images, many of which highlighted his pregnant belly.

Guinness World Records named Beatie the "World's First Married Man to Give Birth" in 2010. In a TV broadcast from Rome, Italy, Guinness World Records presented him with the title of "Unico Uomo Incinto al Mondo", translated as "World's First Pregnant Man". Beatie also appeared on The View, Good Morning America, a Discovery Channel documentary, Anderson Live with Anderson Cooper, Larry King Live, Oprah: Where Are They Now?, and repeat features on The Doctors and Dr. Drew. Between August and November 2016, he was a contestant in the tenth season of Secret Story, the French adaptation of Big Brother; his secret was "I'm the first pregnant man ever." He placed 2nd of all the contestants with 28% of the televote in the final.

Beatie owns a website and T-shirt company featuring the slogan "Define Normal". He has made personal appearances on TV talk shows in Spain, Greece, Germany, Italy, Romania, Russia, Japan, Sweden, Poland, and the United Kingdom, and has given keynote speeches at colleges and universities.

== Legal precedent and divorce ==
Beatie again attracted media attention when a court in Arizona cited his pregnancies as grounds to refuse to grant him and Nancy a divorce in 2012. Thomas initially filed for legal separation, which was afterward converted to a divorce motion by Nancy. News of the break-up with his wife was leaked to tabloids during an April taping of the talk show The Doctors. Thomas was awarded temporary sole custody of his three children and ordered to pay alimony.

During the divorce proceedings, the presiding judge stated that because Beatie had given birth to the couple's children, he was legally female and therefore the marriage was not recognized in the state. Arizona Superior Court Judge Douglas Gerlach issued a nunc pro tunc order questioning whether the court had jurisdiction over the matter. The Beatie case was the first of its kind on record, where a documented legal male gave birth within a marriage to a woman, and the first time a court challenged a marriage based upon a husband's giving birth. At the time, Arizona did not legally recognize same-sex marriage, so if Beatie were found to be female according to Arizona statute, the ten-year Beatie marriage would not be recognized in that state.

Beatie's attorneys at the Cantor Law Group filed a memorandum showing that under Arizona State Statute, a transgender man's legal definition is set by certain medical operations, treatments, and finally a certified doctor's approval. "Since Arizona and Hawaii have virtually the same Sex Change Statute, in this case we will prove that under the law Thomas was a man at the time of his wedding. Sterilization is not a requirement of either State's Statute. Under both Arizona's and Hawaii's law Thomas was a man at the time of his marriage, and therefore his three children born during the marriage are legitimate", stated attorney, David Michael Cantor. Judge Gerlach ordered an evidentiary hearing and oral argument for which the Transgender Law Center filed a friend-of-the-court brief in support of the Beaties' marriage, stating that the case could be significant regarding marriage, divorce, and reproductive rights for transgender people in the state of Arizona and around the country. Expert testimony was provided by Beatie's sex-reassignment surgeon, Dr. Michael Brownstein M.D., in which the doctor implied that gender is more psychological than chromosomal. He also attested that the chest reconstruction procedure Beatie had undergone qualified as a sex-change surgery.

In 2013, a trial was heard to determine custody, child support, and division of property and debts, even though Arizona is not a common-law state. Despite the marriage's being put into question, the courts proceeded with custody arrangements for the children because both Beatie and Nancy legally adopted each of their three children in Oregon, in the Oregon court orders, Thomas was also listed as "father" and Nancy was listed as "mother" on each birth certificate, and each spouse had equal parental rights to custody.

The court ruled that it had a lack of subject-matter jurisdiction to grant the Beaties a divorce and that Arizona did not have to comply with accepting out-of-state birth or marriage certificates. Despite medical testimony stating otherwise, Judge Gerlach did not consider gender identity, hormone treatment, and chest reconstruction as a valid sex-change surgery, as grounds for successful gender transition. "If adopted, (it) would lead to circumstances in which a person's sex can become a matter of whim and not a matter of any reasonable, objective standard or policy, which is precisely the kind of absurd result the law abhors." Beatie's attorney said the judgement contained several errors. The court also ruled to give Nancy joint legal decision-making, physical custody and equal parenting time, ordering Beatie to pay her nearly $240 per month in child support. Since the marriage was not considered valid in Arizona alimony was not further enforced, though the division of property was.

In 2014, an Arizona Appeals Court declared that the marriage of the Beaties was valid and therefore they can get divorced, stating that Beatie should not have had to be sterilized in order to be legally recognized as a man in Arizona or Hawaii.

== LGBT activism ==
In 2000–2001, Beatie was the co-chair and media chair for the Civil Unions-Civil Rights Movement in Honolulu, Hawaii, a non-profit LGBT organization for marriage equality. He helped organize and implement an island-wide, seven-day, 110-mile March for Equality. He also lobbied to pass the state's first hate crimes legislation, which became law in 2001.

In August 2011, he was the main opening speaker for Stockholm Pride, speaking to an audience of tens of thousands. He also initiated one-on-one discussions with doctors, politicians, and policy-makers in support of abolishing the sterilization law for Swedish transgender people. Sweden's forced sterilization law for transgender people was overturned on December 19, 2012.

== Cultural impact ==
Beatie's pregnancy has challenged social and legal definitions of what constitutes being a man or a woman. Beatie's story helped promote transgender issues in the media; other trans men had given birth before Beatie, but were neither reported on nor legally recognized as male. Many media outlets treated Beatie's pregnancy as a "freak show", according to media scholar Andre Cavalcante. Some bloggers were hostile toward Beatie. Women's studies researcher Eve Shapiro writes that media coverage of Beatie's pregnancy ranged from "educational" to "reactionary", and that Beatie "redefines what it means to be a man and perhaps even challenges the binary gender paradigm". Media studies scholar Laura Tropp writes that Beatie's experience "forces society to debate the idea of what is a man and what is a woman". Sociologist Lisa Wade wrote, "I'm not sure what to make, sociologically, of the attention that Thomas' pregnancy is receiving in the mass media, but it is ripe for analysis." People Magazine described Beatie as a "pop culture icon" in the magazine's special edition 1000 Greatest Moments In Pop Culture 1974-2011. His legal case is also a precedent-setter for the ability of transgender people to exercise their constitutional right to reproduce and be recognized as their legal gender post transition.

== Publications ==
Shortly after Susan was born, Beatie authored his first book, Labor of Love: The Story of One Man's Extraordinary Pregnancy (2008). In Labor of Love, Beatie describes the fight for his right to have a child. Publishers Weekly said the book was "A compelling, unique narrative". Book List praised it as "Unforced and unpretentious", and the New York Times called it "Defiant and transformative". His other works include:

- Beatie, Thomas (April 8, 2008). "Labor of Love: Is society ready for this pregnant husband?". The Advocate. p. 24. ISSN 0001-8996.
- Beatie, Thomas (July 31, 2011). "Sveriges lag hade gjort mig barnlös" [Sweden's Law Would Have Made Me Childless]. Aftonbladet (in Swedish).
- Beatie, Thomas; Petros, George (2012). The New Transsexuals: The Next Step in Human Evolution. PetrosIdeas. pp. 34–43. ISBN 978-0-9855018-1-5.
- Beatie, Thomas (2014). "Beyond Binary". In Duffy, Christine (ed.). Gender Identity and Sexual Orientation Discrimination in the Workplace: A Practical Guide. Arlington, Va.: Bureau of National Affairs, Inc. ISBN 978-1-6174-6300-6.

== In media ==
=== Film ===
The documentary Pregnant Man (2008) documented the final weeks of Beatie's pregnancy and the birth of his first child. The documentary was the highest rated show for Discovery Networks for 2008. The documentary continues to screen worldwide.

In 2015, French director Jan Caplin wrote and directed the short movie Hippocampe, inspired by Thomas Beatie and his wife's attempts to have a child.

=== Other media ===
In May 2010, London sculptor Marc Quinn unveiled a 10-foot marble statue of a pregnant Beatie. Beatie's other media appearances include:

- Barbara Walters' Top 10 Fascinating People of 2008
- Details Magazine: 40 Most Influential Men in the World
- 20th Annual GLAAD Media Awards nominee: The Oprah Winfrey Show, Outstanding Talk Show Episode nominee, "The Pregnant Man": subject Thomas Beatie
- 2009 Time Magazine: Time 100 Finalist
- People Magazine: Pop Culture 1000 Greatest Moments 1974–2011
- 2008 People Magazine: 11 Most Shocking Moments
- Advocate Magazine: People of the Year 2008
- Time: The Top 10 Everything of 2008
- Huffington Post: Top 20 Trans Pioneer of 2011
- Oddee.com: Handsome Men (Who Were Born Female)

== See also ==
- Trystan Reese
