= Dyacopterus =

Scientific classification
- Kingdom: Animalia
- Phylum: Chordata
- Class: Mammalia
- Order: Chiroptera
- Family: Pteropodidae
- Subfamily: Cynopterinae
- Genus: Dyacopterus; K. Andersen, 1912

Type species
- Cynopterus spadiceus Thomas, 1890

Genus of bats

Dyacopterus is a genus of megabats from south-east Asia. It contains three species, namely:

- Brooks's dyak fruit bat, Dyacopterus brooksi
- Dayak fruit bat, Dyacopterus spadiceus
- Rickart's dyak fruit bat, Dyacopterus rickarti
