= Calamaria alidae =

Conservation status
- Data Deficient (IUCN 3.1)

Scientific classification
- Kingdom: Animalia
- Phylum: Chordata
- Class: Reptilia
- Order: Squamata
- Suborder: Serpentes
- Family: Colubridae
- Genus: Calamaria
- Species: C. alidae

Binomial name
- Calamaria alidae Boulenger, 1920
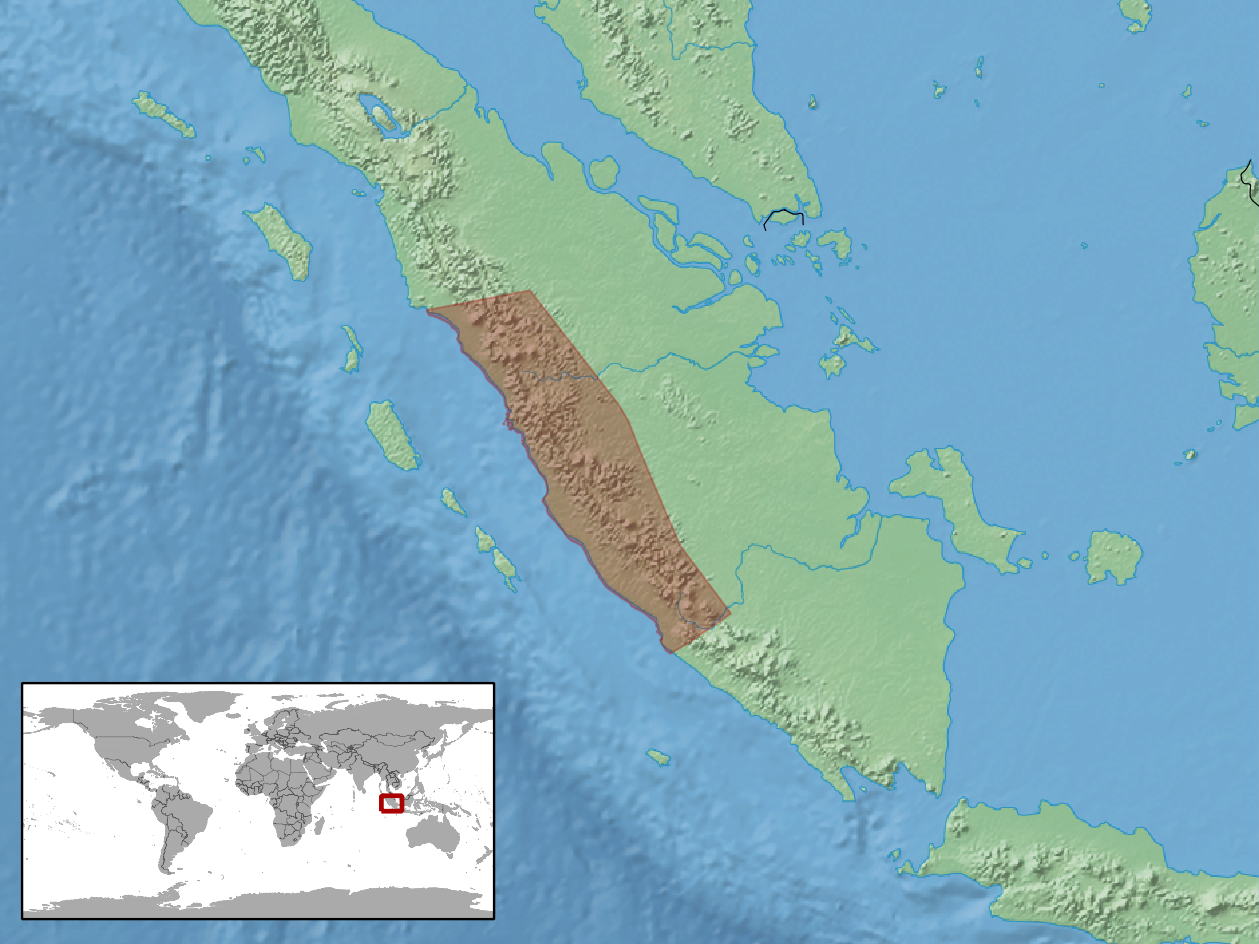

Species of snake

Calamaria alidae, commonly known as the Bengkulu reed snake, is a species of snake in the subfamily Calamariinae of the family Colubridae. The species is native to Indonesia.

== Etymology ==
The specific name, alidae, is in honor of Alida Brooks who collected natural history specimens in Sumatra with her husband Cecil Joslin Brooks.

== Geographic range ==
Calamaria alidae is endemic to western Sumatra in Indonesia.

== Habitat ==
The preferred natural habitat of Calamaria alidae is forest, at an altitude of 100 m (330 ft).

== Description ==
According to Boulenger (1920), the holotype of Calamaria alidae measures 220 mm (8.7 in) in total length, including the tail which is 20 mm (0.8 in) long.

== Reproduction ==
Calamaria alidae is oviparous.
