= Couvade syndrome =

Expectant parent who is not pregnant shows pregnancy symptoms

Couvade syndrome, also called sympathetic pregnancy, is a proposed condition in which an expectant parent who is not pregnant experiences some of the same symptoms and behavior as their pregnant partner. These most often include major weight gain, altered hormone levels, morning nausea, and disturbed sleep patterns. In more extreme cases, symptoms can include labor pains, fatigue, postpartum depression, and nosebleeds. The labor pain symptom is commonly known as sympathy pain.

The source of Couvade syndrome is a matter of debate. Some believe it to be a psychosomatic condition, while others believe it may have biological causes relating to hormone changes.

The name derives from "couvade", a class of male pregnancy rituals.

== Symptoms ==
Symptoms experienced by the partner can include stomach pain, back pain, indigestion, changes in appetite, weight gain, acne, diarrhea, constipation, headache, toothache, cravings, nausea, breast augmentation, breast growth, dry navel, hardening of the nipple, excessive earwax, and insomnia. A qualitative study listed 35 symptoms from Couvade literature, including gastrointestinal, genitourinary, respiratory, oral or dental, stiffening of the glutes, generalized aches and pains, and other symptoms.

== Proposed explanations ==
Studies have shown that expectant fathers experience hormonal shifts during their partner's pregnancy, including increased levels of prolactin, cortisol, and estradiol and decreased levels of testosterone. These hormonal changes typically begin at the end of the first trimester and continue through several weeks postpartum, and are thought to promote caregiving behaviors in new fathers. Research has demonstrated that men with more symptoms of Couvade syndrome have higher levels of prolactin and larger decreases in testosterone in comparison to men with fewer symptoms.

Psychological causes suggested have included anxiety, pseudo-sibling rivalry, identification with the fetus, ambivalence about fatherhood, or parturition envy. According to Osvlosky and Culp (1989), pregnancy causes the male counterpart to experience an emergence of ambivalence as well as a recurrence of Oedipal conflict. In 1920s France, Couvade was claimed to be more common in conditions where sex roles are flexible and the female is of a dominant status.

== See also ==
- Pregnancy in transgender men
- Pregnancy in males
- False pregnancy
