= Trystan Reese =

American writer (born 1982)

- Born: 1982 (age 43–44)
- Known for: Transgender pregnancy
- Spouse: Biff Chaplow (m. 2013)

Trystan Reese (born 1982) is a writer from the Antelope Valley of California, based in Portland, Oregon, best known for publicizing his experience with pregnancy as a transgender man. He was one of a number of transgender men to receive news coverage for giving birth in the 2010s.

== Background ==
Trystan Reese, who was assigned female at birth, began masculinizing hormone therapy in the 2000s. He began working on political campaigns for LGBTQ political movements across the U.S., working on causes like marriage equality, trans rights, and abolishing the death penalty.

Reese met Biff Chaplow in 2010 in Los Angeles, and after dating for a year, the pair learned that Chaplow's niece and nephew would be moved into the foster care system unless Chaplow decided to care for them. They agreed to take care of the children in a possibly temporary arrangement, but filed for emergency guardianship after circumstances worsened for Chaplow's sister. Reese and Chaplow married in 2013 and moved to Portland, Oregon with their niece and nephew. After four years in court, they were able to adopt their children. They began sharing their story of parenthood via appearances on a parenting podcast, The Longest Shortest Time. They hoped to cut through myths that Reese had previously internalized about the opportunities for love and family available to trans people.

== Trans pregnancy advocacy ==
In Reese's 20s, he was informed, incorrectly, that he would be infertile after beginning hormonal therapy. Later he learned that stopping testosterone would let him carry a baby within months. He and Chaplow also knew many trans men who had babies. They decided to have another child and met with informed medical providers to understand how to carry out the pregnancy in the safest way. Reese paused his hormone therapy to become pregnant, but experienced a miscarriage. However, he became pregnant again, and gave birth to a son in 2017 after undergoing a "textbook pregnancy".

The couple documented their pregnancy journey to dispel myths and promote acceptance. They also wanted to support people questioning their identity or grappling with shame about it. After their story went viral, they were subjected to continuous transphobia and threatening messages online. In person, Reese's pregnancy often went unnoticed, which he attributed to a lack of scrutiny for men's bodies that women are often subjected to. However, he mostly stayed at home in his final months of pregnancy as a precaution.

Reese shifted his career to focus on trans pregnancy education and advocacy. He worked as the director of family formation at Family Equality, founded the family-building resource hub Trans Fertility Co., and was the subject of Fighting for Fertility, a Nova short. He also founded Collaborate Consulting, which focused on equity and inclusion.

== Writing ==
As their kids grew older, Reese and Chaplow noticed that they attracted less blatant curiosity as queer families became more common. Chaplow also said that he grew better at tuning out bigotry, putting up his "survivor blinders". They felt they learned a lot from building a nontraditional family and wanted to share those lessons with straight people, deciding to write a book about their experiences. Eventually, the book grew into an exploration of the similarities and differences between queer and non-queer families. He published his memoir in 2021, How We Do Family. From Adoption to Trans Pregnancy, What We Learned about Love and LGBTQ Parenthood.

Reese initially hesitated to make a book due to his limited experience writing, and struggled to revisit traumatic experiences for the sake of the book. He was concerned about how receiving edits would feel, knowing he felt especially sensitive after his traumatic experiences with transphobia. However, he said the process was helpful and he was glad to be able to share lessons he'd learned from queer parenting.

Elizabeth Podnieks compared How We Do Family to Jennifer Finney Boylan's Stuck in the Middle with You, which documents her experiences with trans motherhood. Podnieks analyzes them as works that show new possibilities for family structure that disrupt cisgendered traditions, normalizing queer parenthood. At the same time, the books embrace homonormativity and subvert heteronormativity.

In 2022, Reese and Chaplow collaborated on a children's book detailing their family's experiences with pregnancy. It was published by Flamingo Rampant.

== Books ==
- 2021, How We Do Family. From Adoption to Trans Pregnancy, What We Learned about Love and LGBTQ Parenthood. ISBN 978-1-61519-757-6.
- 2022, The Light Of You. ISBN 978-1-99915-626-8.

== See also ==
- Thomas Beatie
- Same-sex marriage and the family
- Male pregnancy
- Transgender history in the United States
- Transgender pregnancy
- Transgender rights
