= Barrie Drewitt-Barlow =

English businessman (born 1968)

Barrie Drewitt-Barlow (born 15 October 1968) is an English businessman, owner of The Swan pub in Braintree, Essex, and former owner of Isthmian League football club Maldon & Tiptree. He is one of the first gay men in the United Kingdom to father twins born through surrogacy, and has also appeared in reality TV series. Drewitt-Barlow and his husband Scott were arrested in May 2026 on suspicion of multiple sexual offences.

== Biography ==
=== Business ===
Drewitt-Barlow grew up in a Longsight, Manchester council estate then moved to Essex and made a fortune in property.

Barrie Drewitt met his partner Tony Barlow (from Wythenshawe in Manchester) in 1988; Barrie had unknowingly fathered a son, Colin, and Tony was then about to get married. The couple founded a dermatological testing business which they sold in 1998 for £4m. They subsequently developed another Essex-based business, EuroDERM Research; Drewitt-Barlow was managing director. In 2006, EuroDERM Research planned cosmetic and medical research centres in Manchester and Edinburgh. The pair later mismanaged a company wind-up, were investigated for fraud, and accepted an eight-year ban on holding any directorships. By 2022, the couple had started another business, Princeton Consumer Research, with Barrie Drewitt-Barlow as technical director - a company investigated by Australian regulators for potentially providing unreliable tests of sunscreen products.

=== Surrogacy ===
In December 1999, Drewitt and Barlow became the first gay men in the United Kingdom to father twins – Aspen and Saffron – born through surrogacy. The twins were born in a California hospital, with Drewitt and Barlow set to be registered as parents on the children's birth certificates following a US Supreme Court ruling in October 1999. The children were initially denied entry to the UK. The couple subsequently had three further children – Orlando and twins Jasper and Dallas – all conceived in the US with donor eggs and surrogate mothers. The family featured in a Channel 4 Cutting Edge documentary My Weird & Wonderful Family shown in July 2010. In 2011, the couple announced plans to open a centre to help other same-sex couples become parents, with a UK office in Maldon, Essex and a branch in San Francisco.

Drewitt and Barlow entered a civil partnership in 2006, and in 2013 contested a Church of England ban on same-sex marriage in church, getting married on the day same-sex marriage became legal in 2014. Tony Drewitt-Barlow was later diagnosed with throat cancer.

In 2019, Barrie Drewitt-Barlow announced he was divorcing Tony after forming a relationship with his personal assistant Scott Hutchinson (also the ex-boyfriend of his daughter Saffron). Barrie said he planned to have further children with Scott, choosing daughters through IVF, and in September 2020 announced the birth of Valentina Drewitt-Barlow. In August 2022, the couple had their second child together, Romeo Drewitt-Barlow.

=== Media ===
Drewitt-Barlow has appeared on television series including series 2 of Below Deck Sailing Yacht in 2021, and Rich House, Poor House in 2023.

=== Pub ===
In 2024, Drewitt-Barlow began a multi-million-pound refurbishment of the historic Swan pub in Braintree, Essex.

=== Football ===
In December 2024, Drewitt-Barlow entered discussions to become the new owner of Maldon & Tiptree F.C., proposing to rebuild the stadium and its clubhouse and create a "decent football team" that could progress up the football pyramid. The "multi-million pound" takeover was reported on 5 February 2025 with former Ipswich Town player Kevin Horlock appointed as the club's new manager the following day. In April 2025, the club (in partnership with the Drewitt-Barlow Organisation and Maldon District Council) announced proposed changes to the stadium including a new stand, new terrace, hospitality, education centre, fitness and recovery centre, and swimming pool.

On 1 February 2026, Drewitt-Barlow was interviewed about his 2025 purchase of Maldon & Tiptree. Described as the club's chief executive, the BBC reported his views about his sexuality: "There's still a massive stigma about being gay in football". Drewitt-Barlow also talked about the club's renovations, describing the club's facilities as "semi-derelict" when he arrived. Husband Scott and son Aspen were also involved, and, under their stewardship, he claimed Maldon & Tiptree had increased average gates from 70 to 800.

In December 2025, Drewitt-Barlow announced the imminent release of the first episode of a behind-the-scenes documentary about the club, though this was later delayed, eventually set to air on ITV in May 2026. However, broadcast of the documentary was cancelled on 6 May 2026 after Barrie and Scott Drewitt-Barlow were arrested and charged with multiple offences including rape, sexual assault, and modern slavery trafficking for sexual exploitation.

On 13 May 2026, Maldon & Tiptree asked for "unacceptable behaviour" towards the club to stop immediately. Players and fans had been subjected to verbal and online abuse following the arrests of the Drewitt-Barlows. A club statement expressed sympathy towards all victims of sexual offences, adding that Aspen Drewitt-Barlow was the "sole shareholder and controlling owner" of the club. Barrie and Scott Drewitt-Barlow were banned by the Football Association from running a club while police investigations continued. In August 2026, Aspen Drewitt-Barlow said he could no longer fund the club, and the club was subsequently sold to new owners on 9 September 2026.

=== Police investigation ===
Barrie and Scott Drewitt-Barlow, both from Danbury, Essex, appeared at Chelmsford magistrates' court on 8 May 2026. The alleged offences took place in Essex and Manchester between April 2013 and January 2026. Both "strenuously denied" the charges and were remanded into custody to appear at Chelmsford Crown Court on 5 June, later adjourned to 22 June 2026. Two other men from Danbury were arrested on 21 May 2026, and later also charged with multiple offences including rape and sexual assault.

A bail application from Scott Drewitt-Barlow was refused on 5 June 2026, when the Crown Prosecution Service said additional charges would be authorised soon for multiple sexual offences involving a number of additional complaints. On 22 June 2026, the couple appeared at Chelmsford Crown Court. Barrie Drewitt-Barlow had been charged with 15 additional offences including two counts of sexual activity with a child, two offences of paying for sexual services of a child, five counts of rape, and four counts of sexual assault. Scott Drewitt-Barlow was additionally charged with causing or inciting sexual activity and two counts of rape. Both were remanded in custody; a plea hearing was to be held on 7 September 2026, and a provisional start date for an 8-10 week trial was fixed for 18 January 2027.

In the United States, according to July 2026 reports, Drewitt-Barlow was being sued for $25m by a man who alleged he was sex trafficked when he was 16 years old.

== See also ==
- Use of assisted reproductive technology by LGBTQ people
