= Use of assisted reproductive technology by LGBTQ people =

LGBTQ people who wish to have children may use assisted reproductive technology. In recent decades, developmental biologists have been researching and developing techniques to facilitate same-sex reproduction.

Lack of access to assisted reproductive technologies is a form of healthcare inequality experienced by LGBTQ people.

Scientists have been working on a variety of techniques that may someday be used for human same-sex reproduction.

== Freezing eggs ==
LGBT women, trans men, and other people assigned female at birth who possess ovaries, may choose to donate their eggs in order to reproduce by in-vitro fertilization. Trans men in particular may freeze their eggs before transitioning and choose to have a female surrogate carry their child when the time comes, using their eggs and someone else's sperm. This allows them to avoid the potentially dysphoria-triggering experience of pregnancy, or cessation of HRT for collecting eggs at an older age.

=== Egg banking ===
Cryopreservation of oocytes (eggs) requires hormonal stimulation and oocyte retrieval, as for IVF treatment, after which the oocytes are vitrified. Vitrification of oocytes has been found to be more successful than slow freezing oocytes. The success of oocyte banking declines significantly with increasing reproductive age. Ovarian stimulation will increase transgender men's serum estradiol levels, and in response transvaginal ultrasound monitoring may be necessary, strategies to minimize estradiol elevations include the concomitant use of aromatase inhibitors during stimulation. There is no data on the success of ovarian stimulation in transgender men who previously had puberty halted with GnRH agonist, followed directly by testosterone administration. There is also no data comparing the number of oocytes retrieved or the live-birth rate after fertility preservation stratified by time off testosterone.

=== Ovarian tissue banking ===
A surgical procedure is required to collect tissue samples, if undergoing a hysterectomy and/or ovariectomy, one can choose to cryopreserve some tissue at the same time to avoid an additional surgical procedure. Ovarian tissue cryopreservation has been successful, but so far, there have been no pregnancies recorded after thawing and in-vitro maturation of this tissue, successful pregnancies have only been recorded after auto-transplantation. This method has a very low success rate of blastocyst development as in one study of 83 transgender males, 2 out of the 208 mature oocytes were recovered from thawed ovarian tissue created "good-quality" blastocysts.

== Freezing sperm ==
For the purposes of either in-vitro fertilization or artificial insemination, LGBT individuals may choose to preserve their eggs or sperm.

Trans women may have lower sperm quality before HRT, which may pose an issue for creating viable sperm samples to freeze.

Estrogens suppress testosterone levels and at high doses can markedly disrupt sex drive and function and fertility on their own. Moreover, disruption of gonadal function and fertility by estrogens may be permanent after extended exposure.

Nonsteroidal antiandrogens like bicalutamide may be an option for transgender women who wish to preserve sex drive, sexual function, and/or fertility, relative to antiandrogens that suppress testosterone levels and can greatly disrupt these functions such as cyproterone acetate and GnRH modulators.

Semen can be collected via masturbation, but there are alternatives for those who find masturbation or ejaculation distressing or may have erectile or ejaculatory dysfunction secondary to hypoandrogenism. Options for those with dysfunction include: penile vibratory stimulation and electroejaculation. For those who do not want to ejaculate or have oligospermia or azoospermia can pursue testicular sperm aspiration or microsurgical sperm extraction although they are more invasive. There are currently no studies evaluating the acceptability or success rates of the different options for sperm collection specifically in transgender women. Furthermore, for transgender women on estradiol and/or antiandrogens, it is unclear the length of time needed to be off hormonal treatment medication before normal spermatogenesis resumes (if it occurs at all), during which time testosterone production will resume and may cause unwanted masculinizing effects.

=== Storing and selecting sperm ===
Prospective LGBT parents may pick sperm from a sperm bank to grow their baby. The sperm can come from one partner, either having been frozen before their transition, or being recent in the case of a partner having functioning male organs. Other times, it can come from private sperm donors. LGBT individuals must carefully consider where they get their donor sperm from. Individual state's laws vary, but many U.S. states have adopted a form of the Uniform Parentage Act (UPA). Most, but not all states transfer parental rights from anonymous sperm donors to the intended parents as long as the recipient is a married woman, and a physician is involved. Noncompliance with these laws can result in the failure to terminate sperm donor parental rights. There have been court cases where known sperm donors that privately donated directly were requested to pay child support. For example, of these laws, see California assisted reproductive laws. In Australia, there has been legal precedent that sperm donor involvement with the ensuing child's life does grant them parental rights (Masson v Parsons).

Alternative to direct private donation it is possible to purchase sperm from a sperm bank for personal use in fertility treatment. Sperm banks can vary widely, not only in terms of price, but of practice (i.e. who is allowed to donate sperm, how many times, etc.) and can offer a variety of services. Major U.S. sperm banks include Fairfax Cryobank, California Cyrobank, Cryos International, Seattle Sperm bank, and Xytex, and many others.

== Pregnancy ==
The LGBT parent(s) may choose a surrogate or their partner for pregnancy, depending on their fertility and personal values. There are many possible ways for an LGBT individual or couple to become pregnant, such as:

- Artificial insemination.
- Embryo from in-vitro fertilization implant.
- Natural sexual activity (in the case of fertile couples with matching sexual orientation, or otherwise with a surrogate).
- Uterine transplant (yet to be achieved practically for trans women, but has been achieved for cisgender women).

== Artificial insemination ==
In order to accommodate for different gender identities and sexual orientations, a LGBT pregnancy from donated sperm can be done through artificial insemination.

Timing of these procedures are critical for successful fertilization, as the fertile window is the five days before ovulation, plus the day of and after ovulation. To increase the chance of success, the menstrual cycle is closely observed, often using ovulation kits, ultrasounds or blood tests, such as basal body temperature tests over, noting the color and texture of the vaginal mucus, and the softness of the nose of the cervix. To improve the success rate of artificial insemination, drugs to create a stimulated cycle may be used called ovarian stimulation (OS).

=== Intrauterine insemination (IUI) ===
Before ovulation there is a surge of luteinizing hormone (LH) which can be used to time an IUI procedure. Data suggest that IUI should be performed 1 day after the detection of the LH surge. Most clinics in the U.S. perform IUI in the morning after a positive ovulation predictor kit test (which detects LH in urine). An alternative to LH monitoring is ultrasound monitoring of ovarian follicle size followed by a trigger shot with exogenous human chorionic gonadotropin (hCG) which mimics the body's LH surge and triggers final follicular maturation and rupture (36–48 hours later). The trigger shot is typically administered when the dominant follicle reaches 18–20 mm. The recommended timing of IUI after hCG administration is 24–40 hours. IUI cycles stimulated with classical doses of FSH have a high rate of have a multiple pregnancy with rates ranging from 10 to 40%. A meta-analysis showed no difference between pregnancy outcomes between at-home LH monitoring and timed IUI.

IUI can be done without the use of medication. IUI is not recommended in cases where the gestating individuals have cervical atresia, cervicitis, endometritis or bilateral tubal obstruction or when the sperm donor has amenorrhea or severe oligospermia. Prior to IUI, the sperm is "washed" which is necessary to remove seminal plasma to avoid prostaglandin-induced uterine contractions. Insemination with unprocessed semen is also associated with pelvic infection.

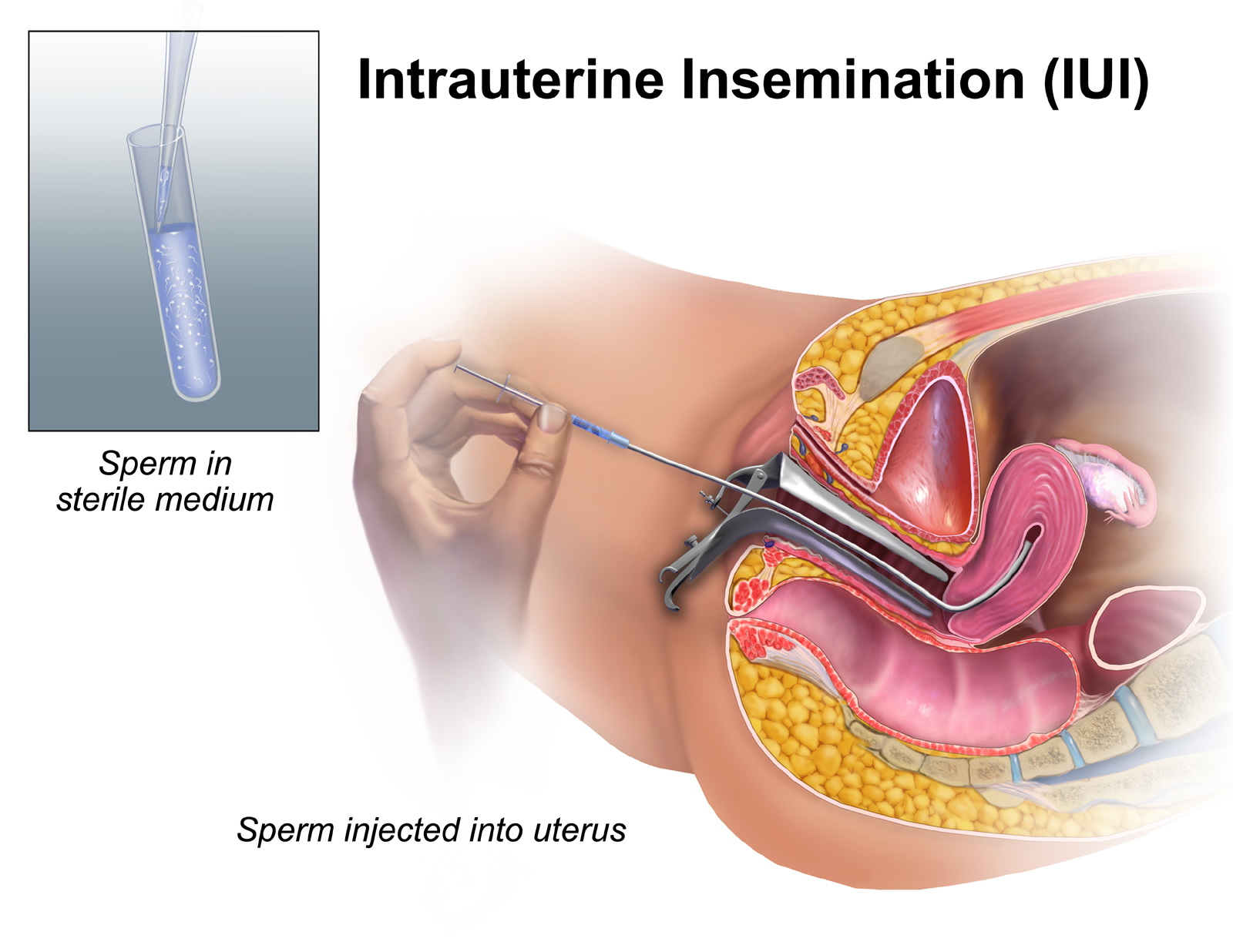
Diagram of the IUI procedure

Intrauterine insemination (IUI) involves the opening of the vagina using a speculum, then injecting washed sperm directly into the uterus with a catheter. Insemination in this way means that the sperm do not have to swim through the cervix which is coated with a mucus layer. This layer of mucus can slow down the passage of sperm and can result in many sperm perishing before they can enter the uterus. Donor sperm is sometimes tested for mucus penetration capabilities if it is to be used for ICI inseminations, for if the sperm's chances of passing through the cervix is low, IUI would provide a more efficient delivery of the sperm than ICI. IUI fertilization takes place naturally in the external part of the fallopian tubes in the same way that occurs following intercourse.

The benefit of double IUI has not been found in patients with undocumented infertility using donor sperm, such as lesbian and single women. Typically pregnancy success rates per IUI cycle is approximately 12.4%. According to a study from 2021, lesbian women undergoing IUI had a clinical pregnancy rate of 13.2% per cycle and 42.2% success rate given the average number of cycles at 3.6. IUI has been reported to be more effective than ICI but this has been contested with some citing no strong evidence to confirm a significant difference between the birth rates of the two procedures. It is speculated that IUI is more effective since IUI brings the sperm closer to the oocyte than ICI which might compensate for decreased sperm motility after freezing and thawing. IUI includes risk of endometritis, cramping, bleeding, and anaphylaxis (rarely). A systematic review and meta-analysis was not able to demonstrate that bed rest after intrauterine insemination effectively increases in pregnancy rate.

=== Intracervical insemination (ICI) ===
Very similar to IUI, Intracervical insemination (ICI) is the method of artificial insemination which most closely mimics the natural ejaculation of semen by the penis into the vagina during sexual intercourse. ICI is the simplest method of artificial insemination and may also be performed privately in the home instead of at a private practice. ICI is the process of introducing semen into the vagina at the entrance to the cervix, usually by means of a needleless syringe. Sperm used in ICI inseminations does not have to be 'washed' to remove seminal fluid so raw semen from a private donor may be used. Semen supplied by a sperm bank prepared for ICI or IUI use is also suitable for ICI. A retrospective cohort study showed that total motility and total motile count (TMC) after thawing were associated with ongoing pregnancy rate; with best ICI results at total motility of ≥20% and a total motile count (TMC) of ≥8 × 106 after thawing.

During ICI, air is expelled from a needleless syringe which is then filled with semen. A specially designed syringe, wider and with a more rounded end, may be used for this purpose. Any further enclosed air is removed by gently pressing the plunger forward. The recipient lies on their back and the syringe is inserted into the vagina so that the tip is as close to the entrance to the cervix as possible. A vaginal speculum may be used for this purpose and a catheter may be attached to the tip of the syringe to ensure delivery of the semen as close to the entrance to the cervix as possible. The plunger is then slowly pushed forward and the semen in the syringe is gently emptied deep into the vagina. It is important that the syringe is emptied slowly for safety and for the best results, bearing in mind that the purpose of the procedure is the replicate as closely as possible a natural deposit of the semen in the vagina. The syringe (and catheter if used) may be left in place for several minutes before removal. Following insemination, fertile sperm will swim through the cervix into the uterus and from there to the fallopian tubes in a natural way as if the sperm had been deposited in the vagina through intercourse. A conception cap instead of a syringe can be used as well.

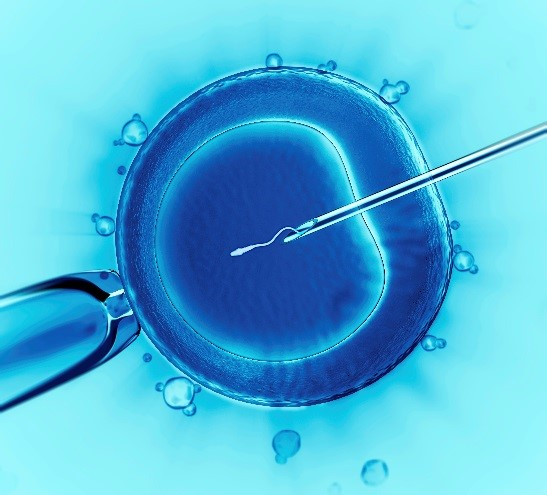
Intracytoplasmic sperm injection

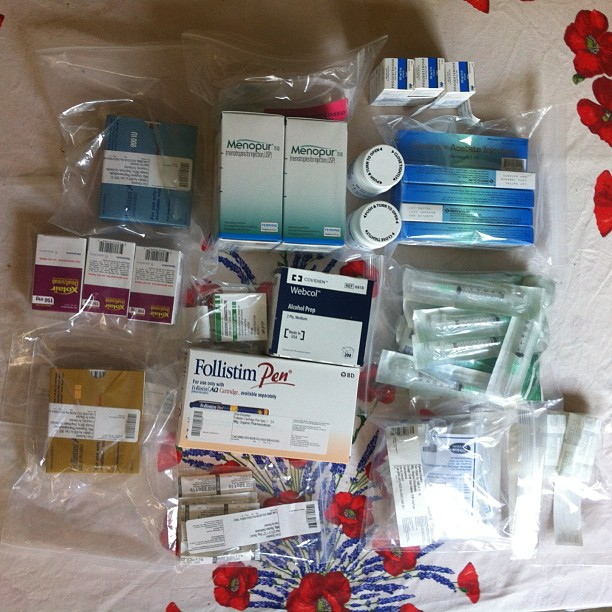
IVF drugs

== In-vitro fertilization ==
Some LGBT parents may opt for using in-vitro fertilization instead of artificial insemination to reproduce. A zygote is created in a lab with a donated egg and a donated sperm, both of which can come from different sources like sperm banks, egg banks or a partner. Then, the zygote is implanted in the uterus. The carrying uterus can be a surrogate parent.

=== Standard IVF ===
Standard IVF is the process by which the egg is removed from the ovaries and fertilized outside of the body, and then the pre-embryo is implanted into a uterus. There are many steps to ensure that this process works including ovary stimulation, egg collection, fertilization, and embryo transfer. To stimulate the ovaries to produce more eggs than usual, the person must take specific hormones prescribed by a doctor. Then, the eggs are collected using an ultrasound-guided aspiration needle. Once the eggs are outside the body, they are mixed with sperm in a culture dish in the hopes of fertilization. The sperm used can come from any sperm donor (either from a sperm bank, or a known donor like a partner). If a pre-embryo forms, it remains in the incubator for two to five days while it continues to grow and divide. At this stage, the pre-embryo is often genetically tested to ensure that it will develop into a healthy baby. If the embryo is deemed healthy, the next step is implantation. The embryos are transferred to the uterus which involves an ultrasound being used to guide a catheter through the cervix and into the uterine cavity.

=== Reciprocal IVF ===
Partner-assisted reproduction, or co-IVF is a method of family building that is used by couples who both possess female reproductive organs. The method uses in vitro fertilization (IVF), a method that means eggs are removed from the ovaries, fertilized in a laboratory, and then one or more of the resulting embryos are placed in the uterus to hopefully create a pregnancy. Reciprocal IVF differs from standard IVF in that two women are involved: the eggs are taken from one partner, and the other partner carries the pregnancy. In this way, the process is mechanically identical to IVF with egg donation. Using this process ensures that each partner is a biological mother of the child according to advocates, but in the strictest sense only one mother is the biological mother from a genetic standpoint and the other is a surrogate mother. However the practice has a symbolic weight greater than LGBT adoption, and may create a stronger bond between mother and child than adoption.

In a 2019 study, quality of infant–parent relationships was examined among egg donor families in comparison to in vitro fertilization families. Infants were between the ages of 6–18 months. Through use of the Parent Development Interview (PDI) and observational assessment, the study found few differences between family types on the representational level, yet significant differences between family types on the observational level. Egg donation mothers were less sensitive and structured than IVF mothers, and egg donation infants were less emotionally responsive and involved than IVF infants. The eggs are then fertilized with donor sperm to create embryos, one of which can then be transferred to the second person's uterus. In this way, one partner contributes the genetic material and the second partner carries the child, allowing both partners to have a profound impact on the development of the fetus and child. The laws around parenthood when both partners do not contribute genetic material are complicated and vary by state, so it is imperative to do research before beginning the process.

=== Surrogacy ===
Some gay or transsexual couples decide to have a surrogate pregnancy. A surrogate is a woman carrying an egg fertilized by sperm of one of the men. Some women become surrogates for money, others for humanitarian reasons or both. This allows one of the men to be the biological father while the other will be an adopted father.

Gay men who have become fathers using surrogacy have reported similar experiences to those as other couples who have used surrogacy, including their relationships both their child and their surrogate have.

Tony and Barrie Drewitt-Barlow from the United Kingdom became the first gay men in the country to father twins born through surrogacy in 1999.

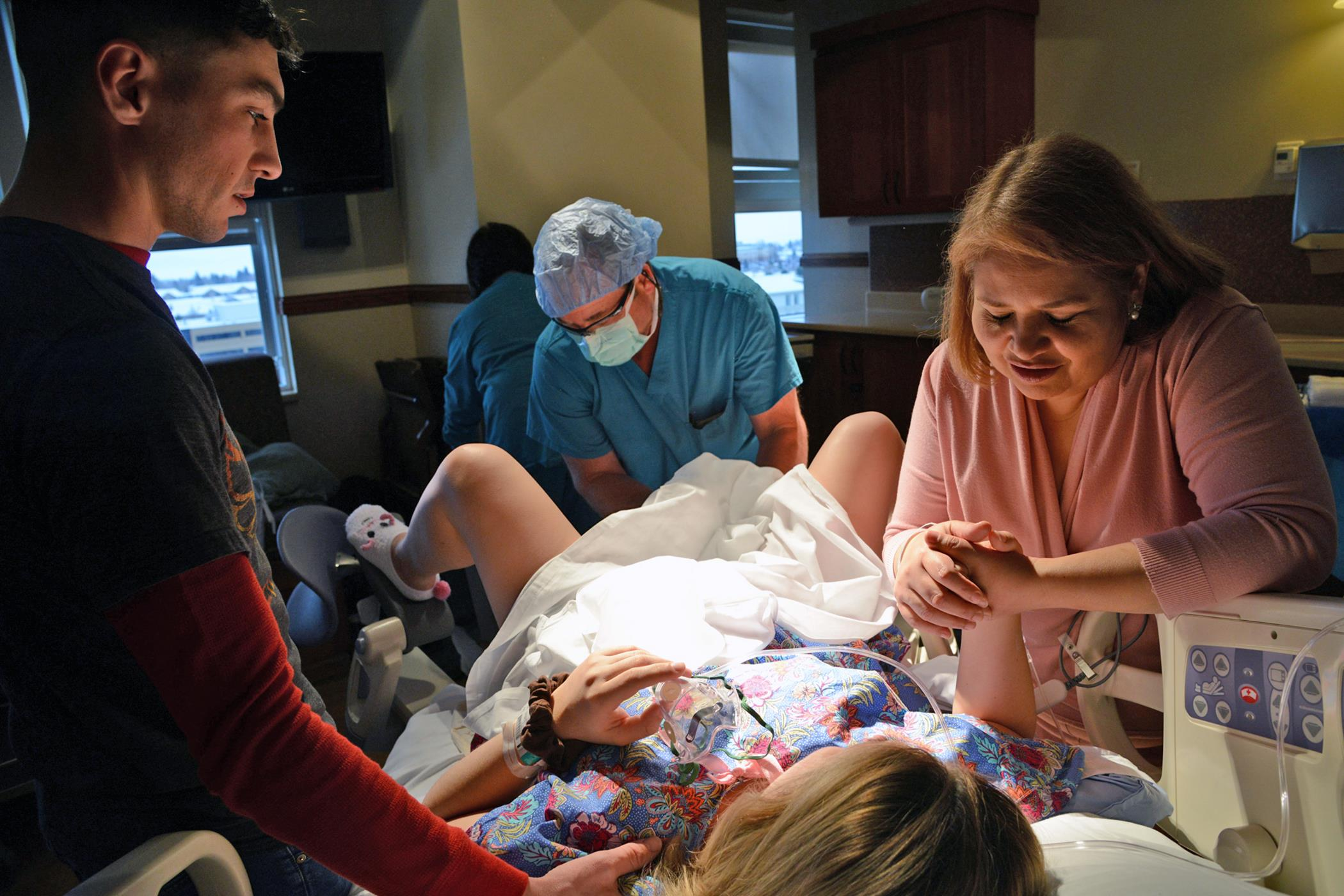
Surrogate parents attending birth

Surrogacy is a process in which a woman carries and delivers a child for a couple or an individual. This can be an arrangement supported by a legal agreement where the surrogate may or may not be compensated. Surrogacy is the most common form of accessing parenthood because it is less complicated due to the biological connection made between parent and child. LGBTQ+ individuals may seek surrogacy when they are in need for someone else to serve as the gestational carrier of their biological child. Recently, traveling for couples outside of the US to seek surrogacy is rising. Usually these commercial services cater only white, wealthy parents-to-be. In some countries it is illegal to pay surrogates, but the debate is that unpaid surrogacy can take place.

Choosing who will be the biological parent can vary from couple to couple because couples get to decide where gametes can come from. Gametes can be purchased through commercial resources, arranged through an agreement from a genetic connection to both parents, or through a friend donation.

There is a long history of transnational surrogacy used by gay parents who seek surrogacy in India. They use gametes fertilized by one or both parents to inseminate local women who are employed through an agency. There is global criticism due to transparency around pay and the outcomes for the parties involved. Because of this surrogacy services in India are being recalled by gay parents because there is restricted access to pregnancy updates. Unable to communicate can create emotional distancing for gay parents and the pregnancy can be stressful for gay parents. Going through surrogate services can be a stressful journey because gay parents are caught up in between charts and graphs, instead of being able to have an emotional connection with the baby through the surrogate and the experiences they go through.

Transnational surrogacy can raise legal issues when the child is born. There is conflict about national legal rules on parentage and this complicates citizenship, which can often result in the child not having legal parents or citizenship in any country.

The World Profession Association for Transgender Health (WPATH) recommends that all transgender patients make decisions regarding their fertility before starting hormone therapy in their Standards of Care (2012) guidebook for medical professionals.

== Transgender reproductive options ==
Fertility implications differ between different medical options that transgender individuals may pursue, e.g. between hormonal or surgical treatments, and between the sexes at birth.

Medical treatments are determined on an individual level between a patient and doctors. Transgender identity, or the experience of gender dysphoria, does not in itself imply any particular medical intervention:

Not all individuals with gender dysphoria choose to undergo medical or surgical treatment. For one, gender affirming surgeries are very expensive and are sometimes not covered by insurance. People with gender dysphoria decide which treatment options are right for them. Some are satisfied with taking hormones alone. Some are satisfied with no medical or surgical treatment but prefer to dress as the felt gender in public. Some people make use of Trans affirming social networks online and in local supportive communities to cope with gender dysphoria and claim a gender identity and forms of expression that do not require medical treatments. Some individuals choose to express their felt gender in private settings only because they are either uncomfortable or fearful of publicly expressing their felt gender. People who are denied or have no access to gender affirming treatments can become anxious, depressed, socially withdrawn and suicidal.

— American Psychiatric Association, Expert Q&A: Gender Dysphoria

Demographic differences have been reported between those who do or do not pursue a genital surgery, including by age.

=== Transgender men ===
Pregnancy is possible for transgender men who retain a functioning vagina, ovaries, and a uterus. Testosterone does not inhibit one's ability to become pregnant and give birth, as it is not a sufficient method of contraception. While trans men can become pregnant while taking testosterone, it is advised to stop before attempting to become pregnant, as taking testosterone during pregnancy can lead to issues with fetal development.

Many trans men who have become pregnant were able to do so within six months of stopping testosterone. Another study conducted in 2019 found that transgender male patients seeking oocyte retrieval for either oocyte cryopreservation, embryo cryopreservation, or IVF were able to undergo treatment 4 months after stopping testosterone treatment, on average. There have been no studies of transgender men attempting pregnancy after testosterone or on the health of offspring conceived from testosterone-exposed oocytes, so exact fertility rates are unknown. However, a 2020 study found that intended pregnancy rates among respondents of a self-administered survey who had ever used testosterone were comparable to those to those who had not - 38% and 45% respectively. Masculinizing hormonal therapy in trans men will often lead to amenorrhea, but this amenorrhea is usually reversible and androgen therapy does not deplete primordial follicles nor affects the developmental capacity of the follicles. However, histologically hyperplasia of the ovarian cortex and stroma has been found. It has been debated if this is physiologically comparable to polyendocrine metabolic ovarian syndrome (PMOS).

Separately, ovariectomies lead to irreversible fertility termination (if the eggs are not ova banked), but does not preclude gestational pregnancy with ART. Hysterectomies will eliminate the option to gestate.

Trans men and transmasculine people who become pregnant are frequently referred to as "seahorse dads."

=== Transgender women ===
Transgender women with a fertile partner may choose to have children through natural sexual activity. It has been found that transgender patients undergoing feminizing hormonal therapy do have abnormal semen parameters. Historically, medical reviews reported that sustained hormonal treatment eventually leads to hypo-spermatogenesis and ultimately azoospermia which will become irreversible at an unknown point in time. However, a 2015 study did demonstrate normal spermatogenesis in long term estrogen therapy patients. There is some research showing effective restoration of fertility by alternative means than HRT cessation alone. Dr. Will Powers has demonstrated the effectiveness of clomifene in restoring spermatogenesis in trans women. His study also includes an in-depth description of other methods for fertility restoration.

Separately, surgical removal of testicles leads to irreversible sterility. It is recommended for those pursuing these options and interested in preserving fertility to cryogenically store their sperm (i.e. with a sperm bank) before starting their treatment. For prepubertal transgender girls, testicular tissue cryopreservation (TTC) is currently the only fertility preservation option. An experimental surgical procedure to remove and cryopreserve testicular tissue for a later date when the spermatogonial stem cells can be matured into sperm. To date no spermatogenic recovery has been reported, and as of 2019, TTC technologies enabling this were only being studied in animal models.

== Barriers to fertility care ==
=== Economic ===
Fertility treatment and preservation is expensive. The average IVF cycle can cost $12,000 to $17,000 (not including medication), with medication it can up to $25,000-$30,000, and price often comes down to one's insurance which might come with stipulations. The cost of IUI ranges from $500–4,000 per cycle. Cryopreservation of genetic material is also costly (see table below) and can vary greatly from place to place, state to state.

Fertility preservation Option	Service Cost Range ($)	Annual Storage Cost Range ($)
Egg Freezing	7,000-15,000	300-1000
Embryo freezing	11,000-15,000	350-600
Ovarian Tissue Freezing	10,000-12,000	300-500
Sperm Banking	250-1,000	100-500
Testicular Sperm Extraction	7,500-10,000	300-500
Electroejaculation	10,000-12,000	300-500

Another barrier is knowledge. These procedures are not well known and discussions of fertility preservation are uncommon. In a study of 133 transgender women 61% stated that no health care provider discussed sperm banking prior to their hormone therapy or surgery. In another study, 70 transgender males cited barriers such as the perceived cost of treatment (36%), need for discontinuation or delay of hormonal therapy (19%), and worsening gender dysphoria with treatment and pregnancy (11%).

=== Physical ===
Only 3% of transgender people take efforts to preserve their fertility in transition 51% of trans women express regrets for not preserving their fertility, and 97% of transgender adults believe it should be discussed before transition.

Some studies report a higher incidence of polyendocrine metabolic ovarian syndrome (PMOS) among transgender men prior to taking testosterone, the disease causes infertility and can make it harder for trans men to freeze eggs, though not all have not found the same association of trans men and PMOS. People with PMOS in general are also reportedly more likely to see themselves as "sexually undifferentiated" or "androgynous" and "less likely to identify with a female gender scheme."

== Future technology ==
=== Gametes ===
==== Lab-grown gametes ====
There is theoretical work being done on creating a zygote from two men which would enable both men to be biological fathers, but as of 2015 it was yet to be practically implemented.

There is theoretical potential for same sex reproduction using stem cells to derive gametes to produce biologically related children, but this has been contentious and was previously considered to be "impossible". However, scientists have successfully created eggs from male mice to produce offspring with 2 biologically male genetic donors and have been optimistic that human application could come within the next 10 years as of 2023. In 2025, several experts estimated this may be innovated by about the end of the 2020s or during the 2030s.

Diagram of the proposed method of lesbian egg fusion. However, this would also require correction of genomic imprinting.

There is theoretical work being done on creating a zygote from two women which would enable both women to be biological mothers, but it is yet to be practically implemented. Creating a sperm from an egg and using it to fertilize another egg may offer a solution to this issue, as could a process analogous to somatic cell nuclear transfer involving two eggs being fused together.

If created, a "female sperm" cell could fertilize an egg cell, a procedure that, among other potential applications, might enable female same-sex couples to produce a child who would be the biological offspring of their two mothers. It is also claimed that production of female sperm may stimulate a woman to be both the mother and father (similar to asexual reproduction) of an offspring produced by her own sperm. Many queries, both ethical and moral, arise over these arguments.

If created, a "male egg" cell could potentially be fertilized by sperm (or other gametes) in the future, a procedure that, among other potential applications, might enable male same-sex couples to have a child who is the biological offspring of both fathers. Scientists have recently demonstrated that human skin cells (which could come from a man) can be converted into egg‑like cells (oocytes) via somatic cell nuclear transfer and induced to halve their chromosomal number ("mitomeiosis") so they more closely resemble natural eggs. It has also been proposed that a man could theoretically use his own cells to be both the mother and father (similar to asexual reproduction) of an offspring produced by his eggs. This concept also raises ethical and moral questions.

==== Egg fusion ====
In 2004 and 2018 scientists were able to create mice with two mothers via egg fusion. Modification of genomic imprinting was necessary to create healthy bimaternal mice, while live bipaternal mice were created but were unhealthy likely due to genomic imprinting.

=== Stem cell manipulation ===
In 2010, American scientists used genetically manipulated stem cells to produce viable mouse offspring carrying genetic contributions from two fathers.

=== Organ and tissue transplants ===
==== Uterine transplantation ====
Some trans women want to carry their own children through transgender pregnancy, which would require surgery such as a uterus transplant. As of 2008, there were no successful cases of uterus transplantation concerning a transgender woman.

There have been successful births with uterus transplantation in cis women, but currently none in trans women as there have been no successful uterus transplants in transgender women. Theoretical problems arise in the sexual dimorphism of the human pelvis, drug regime risk (post-transplant immunosuppression and hormone therapy to sustain implantation and pregnancy), and risk of neovaginal anastomosis. The same studies that identified these risks also came to the conclusion that despite the considerations uterine transplant should not be confined to cis women, with one journal article unable to find any increase in theoretical procedural risk compared to cis women. There is no expectation that trans women would give birth through the neo-vaginal canal.

As of 2019, in cisgender women, more than 42 uterine transplant procedures had been performed, with 12 live births resulting from the transplanted uteruses as of publication. The International Society of Uterine Transplantation was established internationally in 2016, with 70 clinical doctors and scientists, and currently has 140 intercontinental delegates. Its goal is to, "through scientific innovations, advance medical care in the field of uterus transplantation."

In 2012, McGill University published the "Montreal Criteria for the Ethical Feasibility of Uterine Transplantation", a proposed set of criteria for carrying out uterine transplants, in Transplant International. Under these criteria, only a cisgender woman could ethically be considered a transplant recipient. The exclusion of trans women from candidacy may lack justification.

In addition, if trans women wish to conceive with a cisgender male partner, they face the same issues that cisgender gay couples have in creating a zygote.

== See also ==
- Male pregnancy
- LGBT parenting
- Transgender pregnancy
- Female sperm
- Male egg
