= Couvade =

Rituals in several cultures that fathers adopt during pregnancy

Couvade ([kuvad]) is a set of certain rituals in several cultures that fathers adopt during pregnancy.

Couvade can be traced to Ancient Egypt as a "sacred birth custom, of when a child is born, the man experiences the ritual of 'labor' in which he takes to his bed, and undergoes periods of fasting and purification, and the observance of certain taboos".

Couvade has been reported by travelers throughout history, including the Ancient Greek geographer Strabo (3.4.17). Plutarch mentions a report by Paeon of Amathus of a custom in Cyprus honouring the myth of Ariadne (who had died while pregnant) in which a young man would lie down and imitate the crying and gesturing of women during labor.

The term "couvade" was coined by the anthropologist Edward Burnett Tylor in 1865 and is borrowed from French, which derives it from the verb couver ("to brood, hatch"). The term's use in the modern sense derives from a misunderstanding of an earlier idiom faire la couvade, which meant "to sit doing nothing".

An example of couvade was from the Cantabri, who had a custom in which the father, during or immediately after the birth of a child, took to bed, complained of having labour pains and was accorded the treatment usually shown to women during pregnancy or after childbirth. Similarly, in Papua New Guinea, fathers built a hut outside the village and mimicked the pains of labour until the baby was born. Similar rituals occur in other cultural groups in Thailand, Albania, Russia, China, India and many indigenous groups in South America.

In some cultures, "sympathetic pregnancy" is attributed to efforts to ward off demons or spirits from the mother or seek favour of supernatural beings for the child.

According to Claude Lévi-Strauss, the custom of couvade reinforces the institution of the family in some societies by "welding" together men and their wives and future children.

== See also ==
- Couvade syndrome
