= Cecil Joslin Brooks =

British botanist (1875–1953)

Cecil J. Brooks
- Born: 7 May 1875; Cambridge, England
- Died: 1953 (aged 77–78); London, England
- Education: King's College, London
- Awards: FIC, MInstMM
- Scientific career
- Fields: Botany; Entomology
- Workplaces: BMNH

Cecil Joslin Brooks (1875–1953) was a British metallurgical chemist who also collected insects, plants (especially ferns), animals and butterflies. Educated privately and at King's College, London, he was a Fellow of the Royal Institute of Chemistry (1922) and Member of the Institute of Mining and Metallurgy.

Brooks was born in Cambridge on 7 May 1875 and educated at a private boarding school in Hastings before going on to King's College, London. In 1906 he married Alida Johanna de Jongh in Hilversum. Their children included Mercy Brookes (born Sarawak 1908) and Cecil Jocelyn Talida Brooks (born 1913, educated at Monkton Combe School).

From 1896 to 1897 Brooks worked as an Assistant at Stanger and Blount's Laboratories and Testing Works in Westminster, London. He became Chemist to the Sussex Portland Cement Co., Newhaven, East Sussex and then from 1897 to 1900 he was Metallurgical Chemist to Quirk Barton and Co., London. In 1900 he became Cyanide Manager, Borneo Company, at their gold mine at Bidi, Sarawak, prospecting for gold ore in new districts and research on the treatment of arsenical antimonial gold ore. From 1904 to 1906 he worked as a Metallurgist to Quirk, Barton and Co undertaking research in treatment of Cobalt silver ore and bismuth ores, ultimately erecting a bismuth plant and becoming Departmental Manager at the plant. Between 1907 and 1910 he returned to Sarawak as Cyanide Manager at Bidi and then later at Bau undertaking research on the Pahang Consolidated Co.'s tin ores, soils and agricultural matters. From 1912 to 1921 he was Chief Chemist and Metallurgist to the Simau Gold Mining Co., near Bencoolen in Sumatra.

In 1911 he and his family were living in Thetford where he owned property.

In 1915 he sent a plant specimen of Amorphophallus titanum from Sumatra to the Royal Botanic Gardens, Kew.

He returned to England with his Dutch wife Alida in 1924. He remarried in 1927, to Ada Lilian Beatrice Greenbank, née Harbord, who was born in Cork in June 1875.

He studied his collections, including butterflies held in the British Museum of Natural History, where he was made an associate. His collection of East Anglian moths is in the Norwich Castle Museum.

Many species of fern are named for him (mainly by Edwin Copeland); also Brooks' dayak fruit bat, Dyacopterus brooksi; Brooks' wolf gecko, Luperosaurus brooksii; and Brooks' nose-horned lizard, Thaumatorhynchus brooksi.

A species of Sumatran snake, Calamaria alidae, is named in honour of his wife, Alida Brooks.

He died in Hampstead in 1953.
