= Poring =

Tourist resort in Sabah, Malaysia

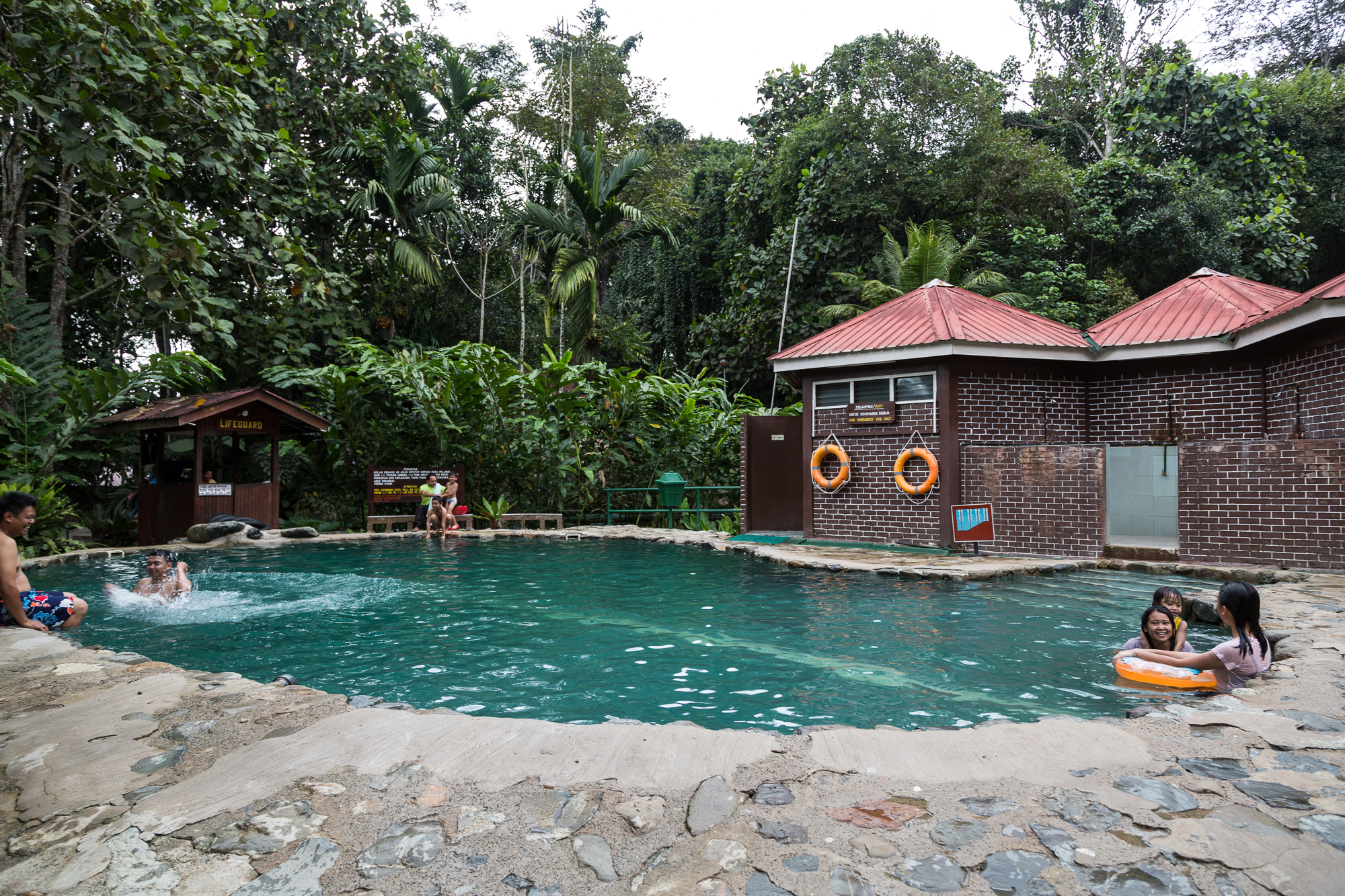
Poring Hot Springs.

Poring is a small tourist resort in Sabah, Malaysia. Located 40 km south-east of the Kinabalu National Park Headquarters, in the district of Ranau, Poring is situated in lowland rainforest, contrasting with the montane and submontane rainforest of Kinabalu National Park. The name Poring comes from a Kadazandusun word for a bamboo species found in the area.

Poring is known for its hot springs and the popular recreation and tourist complex is known as Poring Hot Springs. The springs are known for their therapeutic properties and the waters with their sulphuric minerals are reputed to ease aching muscles. The baths are favoured by returned climbers of Mount Kinabalu.

== Features ==
- Butterfly farm: Borneo's first butterfly farm features a garden, nursery and hatchery for the purpose of research, education and the conservation of endangered species.
- Poring Orchid Conservation Centre: With 1,200 species of orchids found with Kinabalu Park, the centre has the largest collection of Sabah's endemic orchids.
- Kipungit Waterfall: Kipungit Waterfall is a 30-minute walk from Poring Hot Springs. The waterfall is smaller than the Laganan Waterfall, which is a 90-minute walk from Poring Hot Springs.
- Tropical Garden: Mousedeer and other deer are exhibited with colourful birds in the aviary.

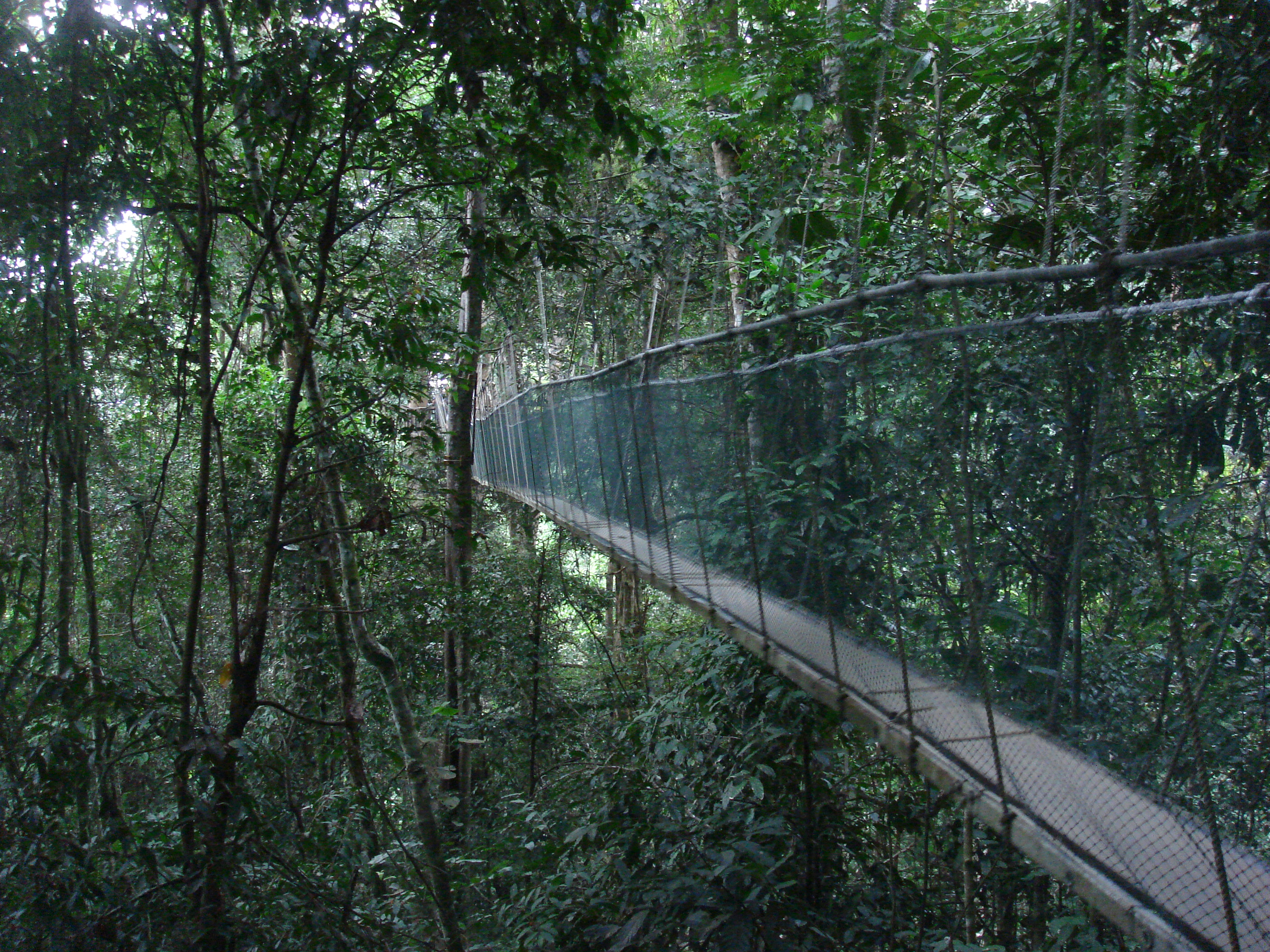
View of the canopy walk at Poring Hot Springs, Sabah, Malaysia

- Poring Canopy Walkway: Visitors can stroll amidst the canopy of the Menggaris tree - the King of the Forest. The Walkway is 157.8 m long and 41 m high.
- Accommodation: Poring Hot Spring features accommodation which used to be run by Sabah Parks under Kinabalu Nature Resorts in a very minimalist approach. Since then, the management has been taken over by Sutera Sanctuary Lodges, which on the one hand has significantly modernised the accommodation facilities, but on the other, rocketed the prices of especially the refurbished accommodations.
