= Female sperm =

Sperm containing genetic material from a female

Female sperm can refer to either:

1. A sperm which contains an X chromosome, produced in the usual way in the testicles, referring to the occurrence of such a sperm fertilizing an egg and giving birth to a female.
2. A sperm which artificially contains genetic material from a female.

Since the late 1980s, scientists have explored how to produce sperm where all of the chromosomes come from a female donor.

== Artificial female sperm production ==
Creating female sperm was first raised as a possibility in a patent filed in 1991 by injecting a female's cells into a male's testicles, though the patent focused mostly on injecting altered male cells into a male's testes to correct genetic diseases. In 1997, Japanese scientists partially confirmed such techniques by creating chicken female sperm in a similar manner. "However, the ratio of produced W chromosome-bearing (W-bearing) spermatozoa fell substantially below expectations. It is therefore concluded that most of the W-bearing PGC could not differentiate into spermatozoa because of restricted spermatogenesis." These simple transplantation methods follow from earlier observations by developmental biologists that germ stem cells are autonomous in the sense that they can begin the processes to become both sperm and eggs.

One potential roadblock to injecting a female's cells into a male's testicles is that the male's immune system might attack and destroy the female's cells. In usual circumstances, when foreign cells (such as cells or organs from other people, or infectious bacteria) are put into a human body, the immune system will reject such cells or organs. However, a special property of testicles is that they are immune-privileged, that is, a male's immune system will not attack foreign cells (such as a female's cells) injected into the sperm-producing part of the testicles. Thus, a female's cells will remain in the male's testicles long enough to be converted into sperm.

However, there are more serious challenges. Biologists have well established that male sperm production relies on certain genes on the Y chromosome, which, when missing or defective, lead to such males producing little to no sperm in their testicles. An analogy, then, is that XX cells have complete Y chromosome deficiency. While many genes on the Y chromosome have backups (homologues) on other chromosomes, a few genes such as RBMY on the Y chromosome do not have such backups, and their effects must be compensated to convert a female's cells from into sperm. In 2007, a patent application was filed on methods for creating human female sperm using artificial or natural Y chromosomes and testicular transplantation. Key to successful creation of female sperm (and male eggs) will be inducing male epigenetic markings for female cells that initially have female markings, with techniques for doing so disclosed in the patent application.

In 2018, Chinese research scientists produced 29 viable mice offspring from two female mice by creating sperm-like structures from haploid embryonic stem cells using gene editing to alter imprinted regions of DNA. Experts noted that there was little chance of these techniques being applied to humans in the near future.

== Comparison to Male sperm ==
In a general understanding, sex chromosomes (X and Y) portray elements that allow scientist to distinguish one over the other. Previous studies believed the same properties applied to an X-bearing sperm from a Y-bearing sperm. Researchers found that the female sperm's longitud, width, and overall density was significantly bigger when compared to the male sperm. In some circumstances, the female sperm was found to be smaller than the male sperm by a multitude of factors based on the donor's genetic conditions. Which was believed to alter the production or growth of the X-bearing sperm.

However, recent scientific research in 2020 has reported additional evidence to refute prior research on female and male sperm. Although there are differences that exist between the X-bearing sperm and the Y-bearing sperm, it has been described to be insignificant since there is little to no unique charcateristics. The female sperm contains DNA content that allows specific genes to be expressed, that plays a role in why the sperm in production becomes an X-bearing sperm.

== See also ==
- LGBT reproduction
- Male egg
- In vitro gametogenesis
