= Male egg =

Egg containing genetic material from a male

Male egg can refer to either:

1. An egg that artificially contains genetic material from a male.
2. An egg from a haplodiploid species such as an ant or bee that is unfertilized and will hatch a male
3. A fertilized egg that a male organism is developing in

This article focuses on the first definition.

Male eggs are the result of a process in which the eggs of a female would be emptied of their genetic contents (a technique similar to that used in the cloning process), and those contents would be replaced with male DNA. Such eggs could then be fertilized by sperm. The procedure was conceived by Calum MacKellar, a Scottish bioethicist. With this technique, two males could be the biological parents of a child. However, such a procedure would additionally require an artificial womb or a female gestational carrier.

In 2023, Japanese scientists successfully created male eggs from male mice cells were developed and used to create bi-paternal mice that grew into adulthood; bi-paternal mice had been obtained in 2008, but they only survived for a few days.

== See also ==
- In vitro gametogenesis
- Female sperm
- Male pregnancy
- LGBT reproduction
- Genomic imprinting
