= Ömer Özkan =

Turkish plastic surgeon (born 1971)

- Born: December 31, 1971 (age 54); Haymana, Ankara, Turkey
- Education: Hacettepe University
- Known for: Performing: the first uterus transplant in the world from a deceased woman, the first full face transplant in Turkey
- Awards: 2002 – Junior Basic Science Prize
- Scientific career
- Fields: Plastic surgery
- Workplaces: Akdeniz University's Hospital, Institute of Plastic, Reconstructive and Aesthetic Surgery

Ömer Özkan (born December 31, 1971) is a Turkish plastic surgeon. An associate professor at the Akdeniz University in Antalya, he led the team that performed in 2012 the first full face transplant in Turkey.

== Education ==
He studied at Cumhuriyet High School in Ankara, Turkey. After graduating from the Faculty of Medicine at Hacettepe University in 1995, he completed his specialist training in plastic and reconstructive surgery at the same university between 1995 and 2001.

In 2004, Özkan served as a research fellow at the University of Tokyo in Japan, focusing on perforator flap surgery and supermicrosurgery, and later at I-Shou University in Kaohsiung, Taiwan, focusing on plastic and hand surgery. Each fellowship lasted six months. In 2006, he spent three months at the Bogenhausen Clinic of the Munich Technical University, Germany on a fellowship granted by the European Association of Plastic Surgeons (EURAPS).

Özkan was appointed associate professor at Akdeniz University's Institute of Plastic, Reconstructive and Aesthetic Surgery in 2006. His scientific field covers aesthetic surgery for face and body, breast reconstruction, tissue engineering, facial muscles reconstruction at facial nerve paralysis, jaw reconstruction and urogenital surgery.

== Achievements ==
Ömer Özkan and his team performed a uterus transplant on August 9, 2011, to 21-year-old Derya Sert with an organ taken from a cadaver. She lacked womb from the birth. This is a first-ever operation in the world because former transplants were carried out by using organs from living donors. It is expected that the patient will be implanted in August 2012 with an embryo, which was previously fertilized and kept frozen, to give birth to a test-tube baby in May 2013.

On September 25, 2010, two arms of 23-year-old Fatih Demirel, who died in a motorcycle accident in Milas, Muğla Province, were transplanted to Cihan Topal (29). Topal lost both arms below the elbow in 2008 after his upper limbs were caught in a corn harvester.

On January 21, 2012, Ömer Özkan and his team successfully performed two important transplants simultaneously at the Akdeniz University Hospital, a full face transplant and a multiple limb transplant, both for the first time in Turkey. The 19-year-old marble worker Uğur Acar's face was badly burnt by a toppled oven at home when he was a 40-day-old baby.

The second transplant was simultaneously carried out in another operating room on Atilla Kavdır, who at the age of eleven had lost both his arms and one leg following an electric shock as he contacted overhead lines while trying to chase away birds with a metal stick. His transplanted right leg had to be amputated, however, one day later due to capillary immunity complication while his transplanted two arms showed no problem. The donor for both transplants was Ahmet Kaya, who, hit by a train in Uşak, died on January 20 at the age of 39. Ömer Özcan personally collected the necessary organs from Uşak, and took them to Antalya on board an aircraft belonging to the Ministry of Health.

On May 16, 2012, Özkan and his team performed the country's fourth face transplant and their second full face transplant. The face and ears of the 27-year-old patient, Turan Çolak from İzmir, had been burned when he fell into an oven at the age of three and a half. The donor was Tevfik Yılmaz, a 19-year young man from Uşak, who had attempted suicide on May 8. He was declared brain death in the evening hours of May 15 after having been in intensive care station for seven days.

== Family life ==
He is married to Özlenen Özkan, who is a docent at the same institute. The couple has two daughters, Zeynep Lara called "Zeynoş" and Lidya Naz.

== Awards ==
- 2002 "Junior Basic Science Prize" at the Scientific Essay Contest, Plastic Surgery Educational Foundation (PSEF).

== See also ==
- Archibald McIndoe
- Joseph Murray
