= Seahorse dad =

Seahorse dad may refer to:

- Seahorse reproduction, where male seahorses give birth to their children
- Slang for trans men pregnancy
  - Seahorse: The Dad Who Gave Birth, a film about trans men pregnancy, made by Jeanie Finlay
