= Birth control in transgender people =

The use of birth control is necessary when a transgender person who is fertile does not wish to procreate. Transgender people face specific difficulties in accessing contraception, primarily due to misconceptions about transgender identity and healthcare among health professionals.

== Context ==
Pregnancy can occur in transgender men and non-binary people with uteri, even while undertaking masculinizing hormone therapy. Transgender people and health professionals may incorrectly believe that use of testosterone prevents pregnancy, which in some cases have resulted in unintended pregnancies. In the United States, trans men have the same rate of unintended pregnancy as the general population in the United States.

Testosterone acts a teratogen, or something that may cause non-heritable birth defects, especially during the first trimester.

Transmasculine people face particular challenges in accessing birth control. Staff hostility toward transgender people, their lack of understanding of transgender identity, being perceived as a man in a medical setting typically reserved for women, and deadnaming and other forms of misgendering that can discourage those affected from discussing contraception with healthcare professionals.

Contraception must take into account the fact that some transgender people wish to have children, as well as the fact that not all trans people undergo the same type of transition—some take hormones and others do not.

== Methods of contraception ==
=== Transmasculine people ===
All known available forms of contraception are suitable for trans men, as testosterone therapy is not a known contraindication.

The most effective method of contraception is sterilization – for example, tubal ligation, hysterectomy (removal of the uterus), or use of Essure, a permanent birth control – however, due to the permanent nature of these methods, it should be performed when the person is entirely sure they have no desire to have any more children. For trans people planning to or considering having children in the future, long-acting contraceptives may be considered. Some studies have indicated that hormonal contraception does not impact the masculinizing effect of testosterone, though it may be discouraged. The use of progesterone-based contraception, such as an intrauterine device (IUD) or an implant, is recommended. The use of certain methods, such as an IUD or continuous use of the birth control pill, also helps prevent menstruation, which may be desirable. To prevent the transmission of sexually transmitted infections, a condom can be used.

Certain methods of birth control may cause or worsen gender dysphoria in some patients, such as taking a medication traditionally associated with women, experiencing side effects such as breast tenderness, or handling internal contraceptive devices when the person feels dysphoria related to their genitals.

A 2020 study in the American Journal of Obstetrics and Gynecology found that between 20 and 60% or transmasculine people use contraception.

In Belgium, transgender men under the age of 25 can receive reimbursement for contraceptives under the same conditions as cisgender women.

=== Transfeminine people ===
Transfeminine people, trans women and non-binary people on feminizing hormone therapy who have testicles can experience testicular atrophy, azoospermia, and impaired spermatogenesis. However, this does not act as a form of contraception.

Vasectomy and orchiectomy are permanent methods of contraception. Condoms are a method of contraception that also protects against sexually transmitted infections. Any partners of who could become pregnant should use an appropriate method of contraception.

== See Also ==
- Menstruation among transgender people
- Transgender pregnancy – Development of offspring by transgender people
- Transgender parenting – Raising of children by transgender or nonbinary people
