= Uterus transplantation =

Surgical procedure

A uterus transplantation is a surgical procedure that transplants a healthy uterus into someone whose uterus is absent, or diseased. As part of normal sexual reproduction, a nonfunctional or absent uterus prevents pregnancy. This form of infertility is known as uterine factor infertility (UFI) for which a uterine transplant may be able to treat. There are two forms of UFI: absolute uterine factor infertility (complete lack of uterus) and Non-Absolute Uterine Factor Infertility (nonfunctional uterus). The etiology of UFI varies from congenital to acquired and includes disease processes such as "uterine agenesis, hysterectomies, uterine malformations, polyps, myomas, adenomyosis, synechiae, uterine irradiation".

The first child born to a successful uterine transplant recipient was delivered by caesarian section in Sweden in 2014.

== History ==
=== Studies ===
In 1896, Emil Knauer, a 29-year-old Austrian working in one of Vienna's gynecological clinics, published the first study of ovarian autotransplantation documenting normal function in a rabbit. This led to the investigation of uterine transplantation in 1918. In 1964 and 1966, Eraslan, Hamernik and Hardy, at the University of Mississippi Medical Center in Jackson, Mississippi, were the first to perform an animal (dog) autotransplantation of the uterus and subsequently deliver a pregnancy from that uterus. In 2010 Diaz-Garcia and co-workers, at Department of Obstetrics and Gynecology, University of Gothenburg in Sweden, demonstrated the world's first successful allogenic uterus transplantation, in a rat, with healthy offspring.

As of 2023, more than 100 womb transplants have taken place, with around 50 babies having been born worldwide.

=== Notable cases ===
==== Germany ====
Except perhaps in rare cases of intersex individuals, transgender women are born with a male reproductive system. While sex reassignment surgery can create a vagina for these women, the option of a uterus is unavailable to them, meaning they cannot carry a pregnancy and would need to take other routes to parenthood, whether it be a more traditional approach involving coitus or an alternative one such as adoption, egg donation, or a gestational carrier. Nonetheless, at least one uterine transplant for a trans woman occurred, for the Danish artist Lili Elbe (1882–1931). Hoping to have children with her fiancé, she underwent a uterine transplant in 1931, in conjunction with vaginoplasty, in Germany at the age of 48. However, she developed a postsurgical infection and died from cardiac arrest three months later.

==== Saudi Arabia ====
The first modern day attempt at a uterine transplant occurred in 2000, in Saudi Arabia. Wafa Fageeh transplanted a uterus, taken from a 46-year-old patient, into a 26-year-old patient whose uterus had been damaged by hemorrhaging following childbirth. Because the patient ultimately needed the uterus to be removed after just 99 days, due to necrosis, whether or not the case is considered successful is disputed, but the uterus did function for a time, with the patient experiencing two menstrual cycles. Members of the medical community expressed concerns over the ethics of the procedure.

==== Turkey ====
The first incidence of a uterine transplant involving a deceased donor occurred in Turkey on 9 August 2011; the surgery, performed by Ömer Özkan and Munire Erman Akar, at the Akdeniz University Hospital in Antalya, on Derya Sert, a 21-year-old patient who'd been born without a uterus. In this case, the patient enjoyed long-term success with the transplanted uterus, experiencing periods and, two years post-surgery, pregnancy. During that pregnancy, Sert underwent an abortion in her first trimester, after her doctor was unable to detect a fetal heartbeat, but this is a common complication and may not have been related to the transplant. Following another pregnancy that was initiated with in vitro fertilisation and sustained for 28 weeks, the patient finally delivered a baby on June 4, 2020.

==== Sweden ====
In Sweden in 2012, the first mother-to-daughter uterine transplant was done by Swedish doctors at Sahlgrenska University Hospital at University of Gothenburg led by Mats Brännström.

In October 2014, it was announced that, for the first time, a healthy baby had been born to a uterine transplant recipient, at an undisclosed location in Sweden. The British medical journal The Lancet reported that the baby boy had been born in September, weighing 1.8 kg (3.9 lb) and that the father had said his son was "amazing". The baby had been delivered prematurely at about 32 weeks, by cesarean section, after the mother had developed pre-eclampsia. The Swedish woman, aged 36, had received a uterus in 2013, from a live 61-year-old donor, in an operation led by Brännström, Professor of Obstetrics and Gynaecology at the University of Gothenburg. The woman had healthy ovaries but was born without a uterus, a condition that affects about one in 4,500 women. The procedure used an embryo from a laboratory, created using the woman's ovum and her husband's sperm, which was then implanted into the transplanted uterus. The uterus may have been damaged in the course of the caesarian delivery and it may or may not be suitable for future pregnancies. A regimen of triple immuno-suppression was used with tacrolimus, azathioprine, and corticosteroids. Three mild rejection episodes occurred, one during the pregnancy, but were all successfully suppressed with medication. Some other women were also reported to be pregnant at that time using transplanted uteri.

==== United States ====
The first uterine transplant performed in the United States took place on 24 February 2016 at the Cleveland Clinic. The team was led by Dr. Andreas Tzakis. The transplant failed due to an undisclosed complication on 8 March, and the uterus was removed. In April, they reported a yeast infection had spread to one of the arteries the surgeons had connected to provide blood flow to the transplanted uterus, which damaged the artery and caused blood clots to form.

In November 2017, the first baby was born after a uterus transplantation in the US. The birth occurred at Baylor University Medical Center in Dallas, Texas, by Drs. Liza Johannesson and Giuliano Testa, after a uterus donation from a non-directed living donor. The first baby born after a deceased donor uterus transplant in the US was at the Cleveland Clinic in June 2019.

==== India ====
The first uterine transplant performed in India took place on 18 May 2017 at the Galaxy Care Hospital in Pune, Maharashtra. The 26-year-old patient had been born without a uterus, and received her mother's womb in the transplant. India's first uterine transplant baby, weighing 1.45 kg, was delivered through a Caesarean section at Galaxy Care Hospital in Pune in October 2018. The surgery was performed by a team of doctors at Pune's Galaxy Care Hospital and led by the hospital's medical director, Shailesh Puntambekar.

==== Brazil ====
The first uterine transplant performed in Brazil took place on 2016 at the Hospital das Clínicas da USP in São Paulo. The 32-year-old patient had Müllerian agenesis, and therefore born without an uterus, and received a deceased donor's womb in the transplant. Brazil's first uterine transplant baby was delivered through a Caesarean section at Hospital das Clínicas da USP in December 2017. The surgery was performed by a team of doctors at Hospital das Clínicas da USP and led by Dani Ejzenberg, the head of the Human Reproductive Center at the hospital. Results of this procedure, the first to be performed in Latin America, were published in the medical journal The Lancet, in December 2018.

==== Spain ====
In Spain, the first uterine transplant was performed in October 2020, at the Hospital Clínico de Barcelona, with two sisters as donor and recipient. The recipient was 34 years old, she had Müllerian agenesis, therefore, she could not get pregnant. Two months after surgery, the patient had her period for the first time and her recovery was normal. She became pregnant, but had an abortion in the 8th week of gestation. After a few months, a new fertilization was able to be carried out and she became pregnant. The cesarean section was performed without any complications and the baby was born weighing 1,125 grams.

==== United Kingdom ====
On 23 August 2023, doctors at the Churchill Hospital Oxford conducted the country's first uterus transplant. They removed the uterus from a 40-year-old woman and transplanted it to her 34-year-old sister, who had a rare condition, MRKH syndrome, that affected her ability to reproduce. A team of experts performed the surgery for 17 hours in total. Prof Richard Smith, a gynaecological surgeon who led the organ retrieval team, has spent 25 years researching womb transplantation, said that the surgery was a "massive success". The recipient successfully gave birth in February 2025. By April 2025, the surgical team had transplanted a total of 4 wombs out of a planned 15, as part of a clinical trial.

==== Australia ====
On 15 December 2023, the first baby (male) was born in Australia to a mother who received a transplanted uterus. Kirsty Bryant received the uterus in January 2023 at the Royal Hospital for Women in Sydney, and fell pregnant within three months through embryo transfer. The donor was her mother, Michelle.

=== Current status ===
The transplant is intended to be temporary, recipients will have to undergo a hysterectomy after one or two successful pregnancies. This is done to avoid the need to take immunosuppressive drugs for life with a consequent increased risk of infection.

The procedure remains the last resort: it is a relatively new and somewhat experimental procedure, performed only by certain specialist surgeons, it is expensive and unlikely to be covered by insurance, and it involves risk of infection and organ rejection. Some ethics specialists consider the risks to a live donor too great, and some find the entire procedure ethically questionable, especially since the transplant is not a life-saving procedure.

Future indications for uterine transplantation may include those with androgen insensitivity syndrome who are born with a male genotype (karyotype 46, XY) and present phenotypically female as well as transgender women wishing to bear children.

== Description ==
=== Ideal candidates ===
Uterine transplant has been carried out on women with fertility problems such as Müllerian agenesis, however this procedure has also been carried out on women for other reasons such as illnesses or injuries in the female reproductive system. Uterine factor infertility affects up to 5% of women who suffer from infertility. In particular, uterine agenesis can affect 1 out of every 4500 women.

One study saw that the choice to undergo uterine transplant is multifaceted with patients seeing it as a way to gain reproductive autonomy and how it enables patients to have a more active role in their prenatal health.

=== Procedures ===
A uterus transplant is considered a vascularized composite allograft transplant rather than a solid organ transplant due to the multiple tissue types included. Other types of vascularized composite allograft transplant include limbs, face, abdominal wall, and trachea.

Uterine transplantation starts with the uterus retrieval surgery on the donor. Working techniques for this exist for animals, including primates and more recently humans. The recovered uterus may need to be stored, for example for transportation to the location of the recipient. Studies on cold-ischemia reperfusion indicate an ischemic tolerance of more than 24 hours.

The recipient has to look at potentially three major surgeries: initial transplant surgery, C-Section, and hysterectomy. First of all, there is the transplantation surgery. A uterine transplant is a complex surgery that involves removing the uterus and upper vagina from the donor while preserving major blood vessels, then implanting the uterus into the recipient’s pelvis. Because the fallopian tubes are not included in the transplant, pregnancy afterward is only possible through in vitro fertilization. If a pregnancy is established and carried to viability a cesarean section is performed at time of the birth. As the recipient is treated with immuno-suppressive therapy, eventually, after completion of childbearing, a hysterectomy needs to be done so that the immuno-suppressive therapy can be terminated.

=== Assisted reproduction and uterus transplantation ===
Assisted reproductive technology must be proposed to all women before the uterine transplant surgery. After the uterus transplantation there are 2 important steps that we must keep in mind to achieve a pregnancy:

Ovarian stimulation (OS):

The objective of OS is to have enough high potential embryos to increase the chance of conception after the Uterus transplantation is performed. One or several courses of OS may be necessary to obtain enough oocytes.

Endometrial preparation:

One to two months after transplantation, the lining of the new uterus begins to thicken and shed in a cyclical manner, and menstruation occurs. Menstruation is a signal that the uterus is functioning well and may be able to support a pregnancy. Endometrial preparation for embryo transfer first involves an estrogen preparation step, to prepare and thicken the endometrium, and subsequently progesterone is prepared, to return the endometrium receptive.

=== Risks and complications ===
Surgical Issues of Uterine Transplant:

- Living Donor:

Uterine transplant from a living donor is a challenging surgical procedure requiring up to 10–13 hours to be completed, mostly due to the difficulty in handling the complex venous system around the uterus. Some of the problems that may arise are the following: hemorrhage, damage to nearby organs, infection, thrombosis, postoperative pain.

- Recipient:

The most frequent complication in uterine transplant is intravascular thrombosis, and also an infection, hemorrhage, damage to nearby organs. A late complication of uterine transplant, which typically occurs several months after the procedure, is vaginal stricture over the suture line, which may affect up to 72% of recipients. During transplant surgery, the surgeon must join the cervix of the transplanted uterus to the vagina using stitches. Over time, during the healing process, this area can form excessive scar tissue that narrows the vaginal canal and reduces the flexibility and diameter of the vagina, causing stenosis.

Side effects of immunosuppressants:

- For the mother:

The risks of immunosuppression are similar to the risks by other solid organ transplant recipients: weaker immune system (increased risk of contracting diseases), renal and hepatic toxicity, high blood pressure, osteoporosis, and potential increased risk for developing cancer.

- For the baby:

With proper selection of medications and strict medical monitoring, the risk to the fetus is low and many pregnancies in solid organ transplant patients have had successful outcomes. The most common side effects reported have been premature delivery and low birth weight.

== Ethics ==
=== Montreal criteria ===
Aside from considerations of costs, uterine transplantation involves complex ethical issues. The principle of autonomy supports the procedure, while the principle of non-maleficence argues against it. In regard to the principles of beneficence and justice the procedure appears equivocal. To address this dilemma the "Montreal Criteria for the Ethical Feasibility of Uterine Transplantation" were developed at McGill University and published in Transplant International in 2012. The Montreal Criteria are a set of criteria deemed to be required for the ethical execution of the uterine transplant in humans. These findings were presented at the International Federation of Gynecology and Obstetrics' 20th World Congress in Rome in October 2012. In 2013 an update to "The Montreal Criteria for the Ethical Feasibility of Uterine Transplantation" was published in Fertility and Sterility and has been proposed as the international standard for the ethical execution of the procedure.

The criteria set conditions for the recipient, the donor, and the health care team, specifically:

1. The recipient is a genetic female, with the ability to consent, with no medical contraindications to transplantation, has uterine disease that has failed other therapy, and has "a personal or legal contraindication" to other options (surrogacy, adoption). The recipient needs to be considered suitable for motherhood, deemed to be psychologically fit on evaluation, is likely to be compliant with treatment and the medical team, and understands the risks of the procedure. In 2021, a revision to the Montreal Criteria was published in Bioethics with an ethical framework for consideration of genetic XY individuals to be eligible for uterine transplants.
2. The donor is a female of reproductive age with no contraindication to the procedure who has concluded her childbearing or consented donating her uterus after her death. There is no coercion and the donor is responsible and capable of making informed decisions.
3. The health care team belongs to an institution that meets Moore's third criterion regarding institutional stability and has provided informed consent to both parties. There is no conflict of interests, and anonymity can be protected unless recipient or donor waive this right.

== See also ==
- Engineered uterus
- Male pregnancy
- Transplantable organs and tissues
- Transgender pregnancy
- Artificial uterus
