= Engineered uterus =

An engineered uterus is an organ cultured or tissue engineered uterus in vitro. Organ culture is the cultivation of either whole organs or parts of organs in vitro. Using engineered uterus is not yet tried to human, but successful childbirth in rabbit was observed.

== Ethics ==
The use of a bioengineered uterus may be regarded as more ethical than the uterus transplant of donated uterus.

== See also ==
- Artificial womb
- Male pregnancy
- Transgender pregnancy
