= Nazgul Kenzhetay =

Kazahk journalist

- Native name: Назгуль Кенжетай
- Born: 1995 (age 30–31) Kyzylorda, Kazakhstan
- Occupation: Journalist, editor, correspondent
- Language: Kazakh, Russian, Turkish, Azerbaijani, English
- Education: Akdeniz University, Istanbul Commerce University

Website
- nazgulkenzhetay.com

Nazgul Kenzhetay (Cyrillic: Назгуль Кенжетай), is a Kazakh journalist, editor, and Kazakhstan's first war correspondent, active in Turkey.

She worked as a journalist on the Turkish–Syrian border in cooperation with the United Nations and UNICEF. She became one of the new names of Kazakhstan in the program called 100 New Names of Kazakhstan held on October 16, 2018. She is actively producing Turkish content at GZT owned by the Albayrak Group which has close relations with the AKP government.

== Life ==
She was born in Kyzylorda, Kazakhstan. She studied at Akdeniz University and Istanbul Commerce University through Türkiye Scholarships.

== Role in Syria ==
She worked as a war correspondent for the United Nations and UNICEF in Syria, and did anti-regime reporting in Syria. We can summarize her view on Russia and Syria in her words:

Russia supports anyone who uses chemical weapons against its own people, such as Bashar al-Assad. This is Russia's policy.

Her view on Syrian refugees is also in the direction of the integration of refugees. We can summarize this with her own words from her interview dated March 20, 2019:

(Question: Tell us more about your projects.) For example, this is a photography project called “No-citizenship Faces”. It is dedicated to the assimilation of refugees, their residence in Turkey and European countries.

== Arrest by the Russian police and the Bir Tugan documentary ==
On December 16, 2021, she was illegally arrested by the Russian police while shooting a documentary in Turkish about the Turkic peoples in Russia. It was widely covered in the Turkish press. Their volunteer lawyer said that the European Convention on Human Rights and the Russian Constitution were violated. The videos they took were unlawfully deleted and they were not given a lawyer. The Abakan City Court ordered their deportation 10 days later.

The Turkish Ministry of Foreign Affairs stepped in and demanded the release of Nazgul and cameraman Emin. The Kazakhstan ambassador and his deputy came to Khakassia for Nazgul and Emin and said that, according to Nazgul, they could send a diplomatic note to Russia if needed. Nazgul and Emin were released by the court on 24 December 2021.

After Nazgul was released she said the following words:

The file prepared about us was written what we did even on the train step by step. The police were waiting for us before we arrived at our destination.

The first episode of the documentary, prepared by Nazgul and Emin, was broadcast on Tvnet on May 4 under the name Bir Tugan. Bir Tugan (Kazakh: Бір Туған, Turkish (literally): Bir Doğan, Russian: Родной (о единоутробном брате, сестре)), literally means "people born the same" in Kazakh.
