= Akdeniz University =

Public university in Antalya, Turkey

- Akdeniz Üniversitesi
- Motto: Eğitimde ve Bilimde Öncü Üniversite (Turkish)
- Motto in English: A Pioneering University in Education and Science
- Type: Public research university
- Established: July 20, 1982; 44 years ago
- Affiliations: European University Association; Caucasus University Association
- Rector: Prof. Dr. Özlenen Özkan
- Faculty: 2,829 (2022)
- Students: 64,335 (2021-22)
- Undergraduates: 37.389 (2021-22)
- Postgraduates: 3,893 (2021-22)
- Doctoral students: 1,540 (2021-22)
- Location: Antalya, Turkey; 36°53′42″N 30°39′3.96″E
- Campus: 925 acres (374 ha); Urban
- Colours: Navy & Orange
- Website: akdeniz.edu.tr

University rankings

Regional – Overall
- QS Emerging Europe and Central Asia: 193 (2022)

Akdeniz University (Turkish: Akdeniz Üniversitesi) is a public research university established in Antalya, Turkey.

It is one of the leading educational institutions in the country with its Faculty of Medicine, Faculty of Law, and Faculty of Economics and Administrative Sciences. The university, where the first face transplant was performed, created a revolution in the history of medicine. It is the 7th best public university in Turkey. Based on its academic studies, it is the 5th university with the most academic articles. Its success in the Public Personnel Selection Examination (KPSS) is above Turkey's average.

Akdeniz University gave its units in Isparta to Süleyman Demirel University, which was established in 1992; in Burdur to Mehmet Akif Ersoy University, which was established in 2006; and in Alanya to Alanya Alaaddin Keykubat University, which was established in 2015.

It continues its education and research activities in 24 faculties, 7 institutes, 3 colleges, 1 conservatory, 12 vocational colleges and 57 research and application centers. It is also a member of the European University Association and the Caucasus University Association.

In the 2021-22 academic year, a total of 64,335 students were studying, as 21,513 associate degree, 37,389 undergraduate, 3,893 master's and 1,540 doctorate students. As of 2022, a total of 2,829 academic personnel, 540 professors, 314 associate professors, 491 doctors, 674 lecturers and 810 research assistants, were working within the scope of the university.

== Academics ==
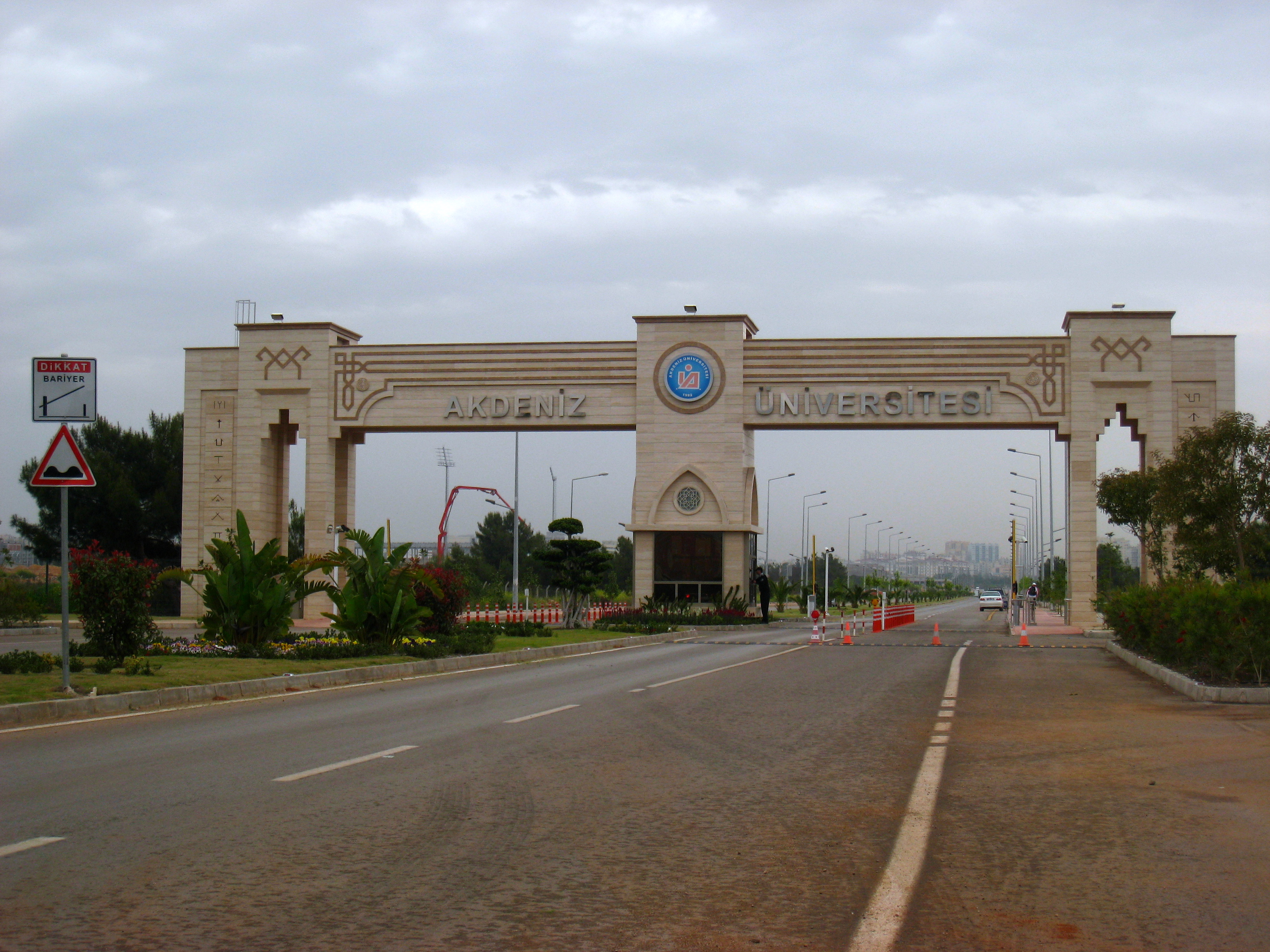
Western gate

=== Faculties ===
- Faculty of Dentistry
- Faculty of Literature
- Faculty of Education
- Faculty of Science
- Faculty of Fine Arts
- Faculty of Nursing
- Faculty of Law
- Faculty of Economics and Administrative Sciences
- Faculty of Theology
- Faculty of Communication
- Faculty of Architecture
- Faculty of Engineering
- Faculty of Health Sciences
- Faculty of Sports Sciences
- Faculty of Fisheries
- Faculty of Medicine
- Faculty of Tourism
- Faculty of Applied Sciences
- Faculty of Agriculture
- Kemer Faculty of Maritime
- Kumluca Faculty of Health Sciences
- Manavgat Faculty of Social Sciences and Humanities
- Manavgat Faculty of Tourism
- Serik Faculty of Business Administration

=== Institutes ===
- Mediterranean Civilizations Research Institute
- Institute of Education Sciences
- Graduate Institute of Natural and Applied Sciences
- Fine Arts Institute
- Prof. Dr. Tuncer Karpuzoğlu Organ Transplantation Institute
- Health Sciences Institute
- Social Sciences Institute

=== Colleges ===
- College of Tourism and Hotel Management
- Turkish Teaching Application and Research Center (TOMER)
- College of Foreign Languages

=== Conservatory ===
- Antalya State Conservatory

=== Vocational Schools ===
- Vocational School of Justice
- Vocational School of Health Services
- Serik Gülsün-Süleyman Süral Vocational School
- Vocational School of Social Sciences
- Vocational School of Technical Sciences
- Demre Dr. Hasan Ünal Vocational School
- Elmalı Vocational School
- Finike Vocational School
- Göynük Culinary Arts Vocational School
- Korkuteli Vocational School
- Kumluca Vocational School
- Manavgat Vocational School

== Achievements ==
On January 21, 2011, Turkish surgeon Ömer Özkan and his team successfully performed the country’s first-ever full face transplant at the university's hospital in Antalya. The 19-year-old patient, Uğur Acar's face was badly burnt in a house fire when he was a baby. The donor was 39-year-old Ahmet Kaya, who died on January 20. The surgery team accomplished at the same time another transplant, a double-arm and one-leg limb transplant, on Atilla Kavdı using the organs of the same donor.

Surgeon Dr. Ömer Özkan performed on May 16, 2012 with his team country's fourth face and their second full face transplant. The face and ears of the 27-year-old patient Turan Çolak from İzmir was burnt as he fell into an oven when he was three and half years old. The donor was Tevfik Yılmaz, a 19-year young man from Uşak, who had attempted suicide on May 8. He was declared brain dead in the evening hours of May 15 after having been in intensive care station for seven days.

== Affiliations ==
The university is a member of the European University Association and involved in international relations and projects such as Leonardo and Erasmus. The university is a member of the Caucasus University Association.

== Notable people ==
=== Alumni ===
- Azize Tanrıkulu (born 1986), 2008 Olympic silver medalist and European champion Turkish female taekwondo athlete
- Bahri Tanrıkulu (born 1980), 2004 Olympic silver medalist and multiple World and European champion Turkish taekwondo athlete
- Burak Yeter, Turkish DJ, record producer and remixer.
- Nazgul Kenzhetay (born 1995), Kazakh journalist.

=== Faculty ===
- Mustafa Kalemli (born 1943), Turkish physician and politician, who served as the Speaker of the parliament
- Ömer Özkan (born 1971), Prof. Dr. at Institute of Plastic, Reconstructive and Aesthetic Surgery, who performed the country's first full face transplant
