= Transgender parenting =

Raising of children by transgender or nonbinary people

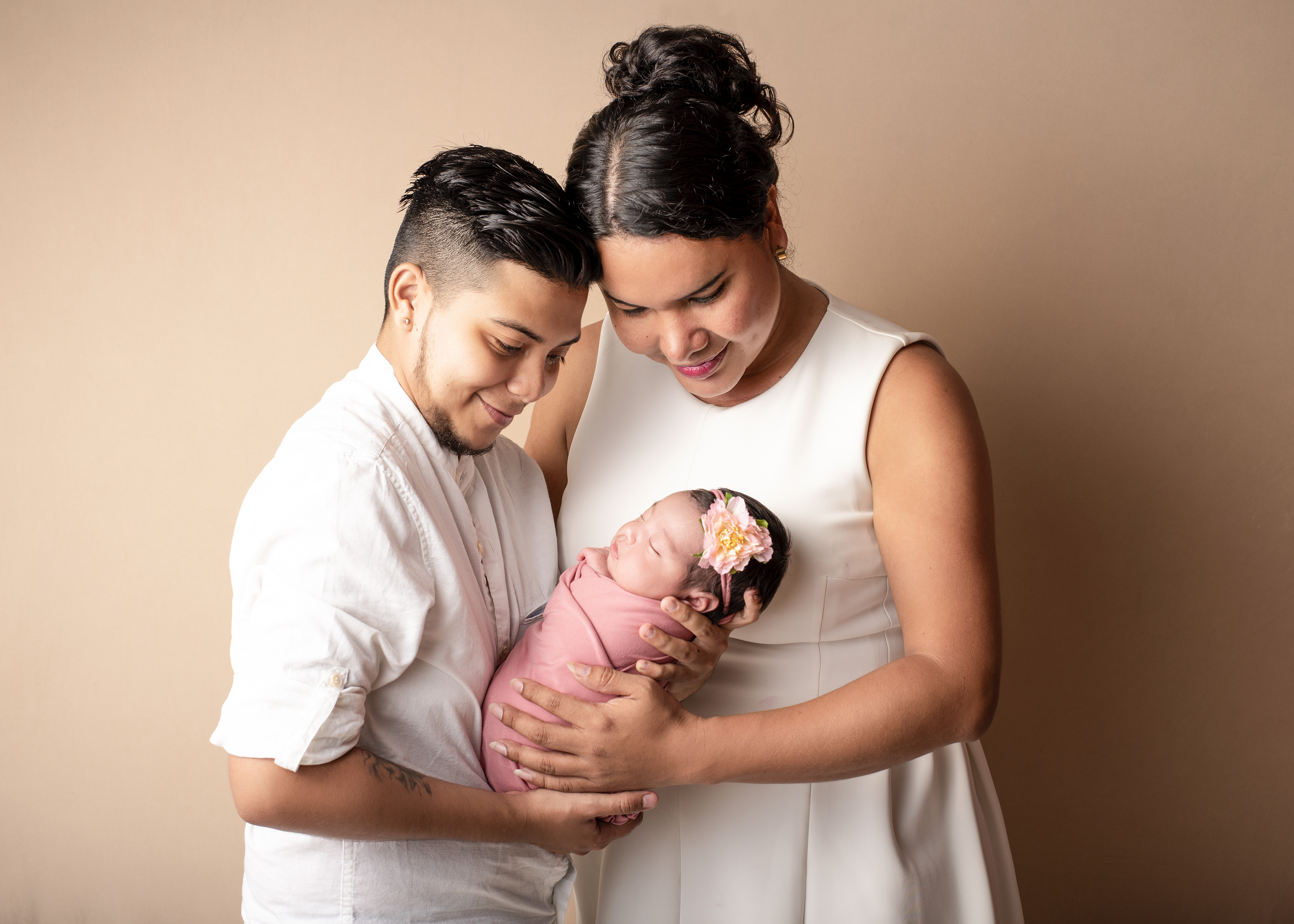
Diane Rodríguez and Zack Elías, both of whom are transgender, with their daughter

Transgender parenting occurs when transgender or nonbinary people reproduce or are involved with raising a child. Transgender parents may face biological, legal, and social difficulties not encountered by cisgender, heterosexual parents. For example, a trans man in the United Kingdom was refused gender recognition because he wanted to have a child.

== Demographics ==
A Canadian survey conducted by Pyne et al. in 2015 found that about 24% of transgender individuals identified as parents, with the majority identifying as trans women and around three-quarters being older than 35. Around 77% of Canadian transgender parents claimed to be the biological parents of their children, with 24% identifying as step-parents. Support for the gender identity of trans parents by their children was found to be around 43%, though experiences of transphobia did not appear to differ based on the parental status of trans people.

In the United States, a 2024 report by the Williams Institute reported that around 15% of transgender people parent children, including 20% of transgender men, 13% of gender non-conforming people and 12% of transgender women. However, 54% of trans women, 27% of trans women and 13% of non-binary people reported that they wished they could have children but could not.

== Social Stressors Impacting Transgender Parenting ==
There are numerous obstacles that transgender people face in general, such as higher rates of bad health outcomes and discriminatory experiences in day-to-day life. The amount of literature that focuses on the unique challenges that transgender parents face is limited; however, some studies have found that the transgender experience and their transition often negatively impact their familial dynamics and relationships. In a study conducted by Amanda Veldorale-Griffin and Carol Anderson, Darling found that families who have limited access to the proper resources that offer support, or with harmful perceptions of parental transitioning, are more likely to experience higher rates of stress compared to family units who have greater support and positive perceptions towards transitioning. There is a need for further access to social services, such as therapists, to guide families who are transitioning to support their times of increased stress and transition.

== Children with Transgender Parents ==
Children who experienced a parent’s transition also have many unique experiences with their changing relationship to their parents. Though this is another understudied aspect of being a trans* parent, scholars such as Jaclyn Tabor in Journal of Marriage and Family conducted interviews of adult children of transgender parents and discussed topics of role ambiguity and ways these individuals coped with their parents' transition. “When a parent undergoes a gender transition, our society lacks both the language and social scripts to describe how parent–child relationships and roles should look afterward.” From the interviews Tabor conducted, one of the themes of the children was role-relation ambiguity. Tabor explains that, with limited to no data on how household roles of parenting are seen in immediate families containing a transgender parent, phrases such as “role ambiguity” and “role-relational ambiguity” can be useful in understanding children of trans parents, but fall short because they were not made with trans parents in mind. “Gender is the primary foundation for how family members relate to one another, as gender scholars argue, then a parent's transition might complicate family relationships by disrupting parental roles that are tightly linked in this culture to gender ("mother" and "father").”

== Historical Bias about Transgender Family Building ==
One historical societal bias that transgender population faces is that transgender individuals are not interested in maintaining their reproductive potential. In a 2023 US study that assessed the desire of having children among 18 to 44-year-old transgender individuals (n= 10,270 unique transgender and gender diverse patients), over one quarter reported they are interested in or undetermined about having genetically related children.

Another historical bias that transgender and gender diverse individuals face is that it has been posited that transgender men specifically must undergo fertility preservation before any hormonal therapy to achieve the best results of in vitro fertilization. A study conducted in 2019 investigated assisted reproductive technology outcomes in female-to-male transgender cohorts compared to the results of cisgender cohorts, found that patients can have ovarian stimulation outcomes that are similar to those of cisgender counterparts. Results disprove the idea that transgender patients who had testosterone therapy would yield poorer eggs, but actually yield eggs similar to or better than their cisgender counterparts.

It was believed, back in the 1960s, that if a trans parent was looking to transition that they should cut off their relationship with their child completely to protect their child. However, the adjustment of the child through a life event, such as their parent transitioning, is no more of a stressor than that of another life change, such as divorce.
