= Menstruation among transgender people =

Menstruation in transgender people affects the majority of transmasculine individuals and some non-binary people during all or part of their lives. Its occurrence raises various challenges, such as stress and anxiety, which can trigger or exacerbate episodes of dysphoria. Menstruating also creates complications regarding the passing of trans individuals, and accessing appropriate restrooms can be difficult.

Transgender women may experience symptoms similar to those of the menstrual cycle when undergoing feminizing hormone therapy.

== History ==
Menstruation in transgender people remains an under-explored area of research. It is difficult to find volunteers willing to discuss the phenomenon of menstruation in trans individuals.

== People affected by menstruation ==
Transgender men who have uteruses typically can menstruate, particularly when they are not undergoing testosterone-based hormone therapy. One of the effects of hormone therapy is the cessation of the menstrual cycle and periods after a certain period of administration, either through testosterone alone or with the addition of progesterone. Some trans people also choose to limit their testosterone intake to a level low enough to maintain their periods. It is also possible to use contraceptive pills to suppress menstruation.

Transgender women do not menstruate, since they do not usually have a uterus, but their hormone replacement therapy can trigger a set of symptoms similar to premenstrual syndrome or those accompanying a menstrual cycle.

The term menstruators has been used to be inclusive of trans and intersex people.

== Challenges ==
Menstruation can be a particularly negative experience for transgender people, confronting them with situations that exacerbate the disconnect between their gender identity and a biological phenomenon characteristic of the female sex and socially associated with femininity.

The experience of menstruating serves as a reminder of the vagina, as do the physical and psychological symptoms sometimes associated with it (such as premenstrual syndrome or premenstrual dysphoric disorder), which can trigger dysphoria. According to Louie Stafford, menstruation can be a source of shame and a reminder of the body's alienation from this physiological phenomenon.

One of the cited sources of stress is access to restrooms, which are often gendered, along with the surveillance associated with them. Transmasculine individuals who menstruate and use men's restrooms are often faced with a lack of waste bins to dispose of used sanitary products, as well as the risk that the sound of unwrapping these products could be heard in the room, thereby revealing their trans identity.

Menstrual products typically feature feminine packaging designs, with very few options marketed toward masculine transgender individuals. Furthermore, representation in advertisements for sanitary products almost exclusively features cisgender women. In 2019, the menstrual care brand Always announced plans to remove the female Venus symbol from their packaging to be inclusive to transgender users.

Some trans people avoid discussing the topic with their healthcare providers to prevent their gender identity from being invalidated.

Finally, a lack of information regarding amenorrhea and contraception leads to risks of unwanted pregnancy for trans individuals undergoing masculinizing hormone therapy, who may wrongly believe they are unable to become pregnant.

== See also ==
- Transgender pregnancy
- Birth control in transgender people

== Bibliography ==
- Frank, S. E.; Dellaria, Jac (2020). "Navigating the Binary: A Visual Narrative of Trans and Genderqueer Menstruation". The Palgrave Handbook of Critical Menstruation Studies. Singapore: Palgrave Macmillan. pp. 69–76. doi:10.1007/978-981-15-0614-7_7. ISBN 978-981-15-0613-0. PMID 33347161.
- Chrisler, Joan C.; Gorman, Jennifer A.; Manion, Jen; Murgo, Michael (2016-11-01). "Queer periods: attitudes toward and experiences with menstruation in the masculine of centre and transgender community". Culture, Health & Sexuality. 18 (11): 1238–1250. doi:10.1080/13691058.2016.1182645. ISSN 1369-1058. PMID 27212580.
