= Transgender pregnancy =

Development of offspring by transgender people

Transgender pregnancy is the gestation of one or more embryos or fetuses by transgender people. This is possible for those born with female reproductive systems. However, transition-related treatments may impact fertility. Transgender men and nonbinary people who are or wish to become pregnant face social, medical, legal, and psychological concerns. As uterus transplantations are currently experimental, and none have successfully been performed on trans women, they currently cannot become pregnant.

== Trans men ==
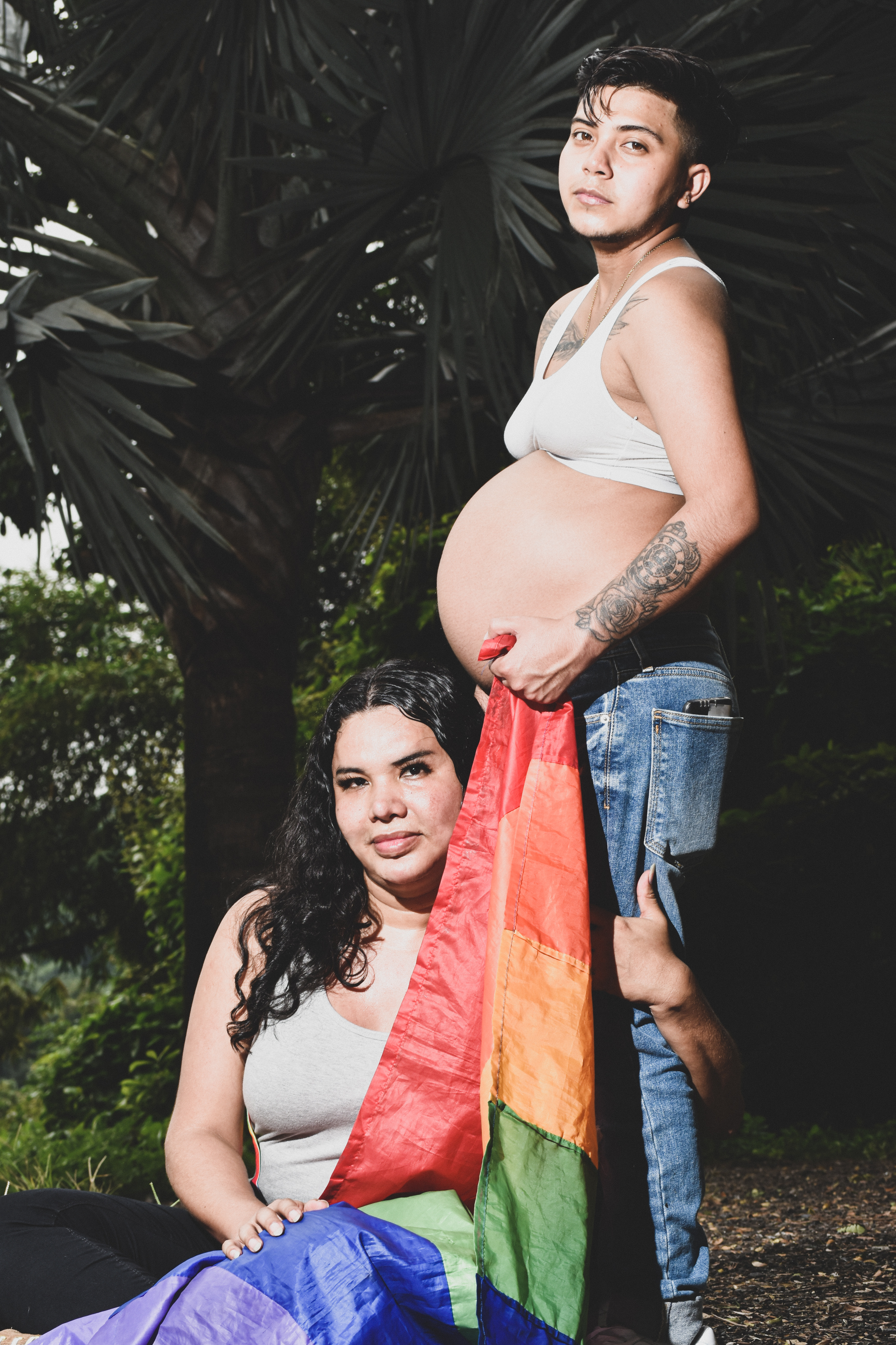
Pregnant trans man Zack Elías and his transgender wife, Diane Rodríguez.

Pregnancy is possible for transgender men who retain functioning ovaries and a uterus, such as in the case of Thomas Beatie. Regardless of prior hormone replacement therapy (HRT) treatments, the progression of pregnancy and birthing procedures are typically the same as those of cisgender women. Delivery options include conventional methods such as vaginal delivery and cesarean section, and patient preference should be taken into consideration in order to reduce gender dysphoric feelings associated with certain physical changes and sensations.

Among the wide array of transgender-related therapies available, including surgical and medical interventions, some offer the option of preserving fertility while others may compromise one's ability to become pregnant (including bilateral salpingo-oophorectomy and/or total hysterectomy). In a study of American trans men, 28.3% reported that they were afraid of not being able to become pregnant because of hormone therapy. Because some trans men want to carry children, it is important for providers to discuss fertility preservation options with trans male clients before prescribing HRT.

=== Effect of masculinizing hormone therapy on fertility ===
HRT for trans men typically decreases fertility for the duration of continued testosterone usage, suppressing to some degree the ovarian cycle and uterine cycle which would otherwise cause oocyte maturation, ovulation, and menstruation every month. Testosterone use in trans men and other transmasculine individuals can lead to an increased amount of ovarian cysts, also seen in cisgender women with PMOS, in which they are associated with decreased fertility. Individuals studied also displayed follicular atresia, overgrowth of the stroma, and the replacement of ovarian tissue with collagen. The uterine tubes of many trans men studied were also closed or partially closed; normally, the uterine tubes are clear, allowing for fertilized oocytes to easily move to the uterus. However, observation of trans men and studies on lab mice reveal that testosterone treatment does not affect the number of available gametes (eggs/sex cells).

Despite its effects on fertility, testosterone therapy is not an effective contraceptive. Trans men and nonbinary people who take testosterone may still become pregnant even if their periods have stopped, especially if they miss doses of testosterone. Evidence from the dissected ovaries of trans men suggests that about one third of amenhorrheic trans people taking testosterone still ovulate, or produce fertile eggs, which can put them at risk of pregnancy.

Patients experiencing amenorrhea (an expected effect of testosterone therapy) may experience additional challenges in identifying early pregnancies due to the lack of regular periods that could indicate a pregnancy if missed, for example. For this reason, it is important for patients and healthcare practitioners to comprehensively discuss fertility goals, family planning and contraceptive options during gender-affirming care.

A 2015 study found that many trans men who had planned pregnancies were able to conceive within six months of stopping or pausing testosterone, while a landmark 2019 study found that many could conceive with assisted reproductive technology within four months of stopping or pausing testosterone. Testosterone-induced changes to the reproductive tract may be partly or completely reversed after stopping HRT; it has been shown that historical HRT use may not negatively impact ovarian stimulation outcomes, with no significant differences in the markers of follicular function or oocyte maturity between transgender men with and without a history of testosterone use.

=== Effects of masculinizing hormone therapy on pregnancy ===
Continuous testosterone use is contraindicated (not medically recommended) at the same time a trans man is attempting to conceive, pregnant, or while breastfeeding. This is because exposing a fetus to high levels of exogenous testosterone may damage an embryo or fetus, especially the urogenital system of a female fetus. This is particularly important in the first trimester when many pregnancies have not been discovered yet. Previous studies of pregnancies in women suggest that high levels of endogenous androgens are associated with reduced birth weight, although it is unclear how prior testosterone in a childbearing trans person may affect birth weight. Future pregnancies can be achieved by oophyte banking, but the process may increase gender dysphoria or may not be accessible due to lack of insurance coverage.

Another important postpartum consideration for trans men is whether to resume testosterone therapy. There is currently no evidence that testosterone enters breast milk in a significant quantity. However, elevated testosterone levels may suppress lactation and healthcare guidelines have previously recommended that trans men do not undergo testosterone therapy while chestfeeding (breastfeeding). Trans men who undergo chest reconstruction surgery may maintain the ability to chestfeed.

=== Chestfeeding ===
Chestfeeding is possible for many trans men who medically transition, but it is rarely discussed by doctors who prescribe testosterone or complete chest masculinization surgeries. While chestfeeding can be a dysphoric activity for some trans men and nonbinary people, some find it fulfilling and a practice that connects them to their baby.

Some chest masculinization surgeries prohibit people from chestfeeding at all, but some surgeries maintain the mammary glands and just remove breast tissue. With these surgeries, the baby can have trouble latching and milk supply may be diminished. This can be bypassed with medication and support from doctors.

For people that are attempting chestfeeding without chest masculinization surgery, chest binding has an effect on milk supply. Binding for years or binding unsafely for long periods of time prior to pregnancy can negatively affect glandular tissue and chestfeeding ability, and binding during a chestfeeding period is not recommended, as it can cause mastitis.

=== Mental health ===
It has previously been shown that transgender individuals often experience higher rates of suicidality than cisgender people and lesser degrees of social support from their environment and familial relationships. Relatedly, many transgender individuals experiencing pregnancy reported that choices of healthcare providers were substantially impacted by the views of the healthcare worker, and many transgender people prefer midwifery services rather than experience labor and delivery in a hospital.

Some individuals reported having gender dysphoria and feelings of isolation due to the public reception of their gender identity and drastic changes in appearance which occur during pregnancy, such as enlarged breasts. Some state feeling disconnected or alienated from their pregnant bodies. Both social gender dysphoria (related to perception by others) and physical gender dysphoria (perception of one's own body) can occur while a trans person is pregnant.

Unintended pregnancy can also be dangerous to a trans person's mental health. According to a study of American transgender men between the ages of 18 and 45, 30.5% reported being afraid of pregnancy. Unwanted pregnancy can cause severe gender dysphoria and suicidal ideation in trans people. One nonbinary person who performed a self-induced abortion stated,

[I used] blunt force to [my] abdomen. Considered drinking poison, as my insurance did not cover an abortion. Luckily, I was able to get on state insurance which did cover the procedure, so it did not come to that. I 100% would have done it. Dying was a better alternative to forced pregnancy.

According to the National Transgender Discrimination Survey, postpartum rates of suicide and depression in trans individuals has been found to be higher than the adult average. This may be attributed to factors such as lack of social support, discrimination, and lack of adequate healthcare practitioner training.

=== Sociocultural factors ===
Transgender people, including trans men and nonbinary people, are more likely than the general population to experience homelessness, food insecurity, intimate partner violence, and adverse child experiences. All of these can impact pregnancy outcomes. Additionally, trans people experience minority stress and may be at higher risk of substance use than the general population. Some also report avoiding medical care or mistrusting medical professionals because of discrimination.

=== Medical discrimination ===
Some trans men who carry pregnancies are subjected to discrimination, which can include a variety of negative social, emotional, and medical experiences, as pregnancy is regarded as an exclusively feminine or female activity. Some medical pregnancy benefits such as those listed in the Family and Medical Leave Act (FMLA) are exclusive to those legally marked as female, thus excluding some transgender individuals who may be pregnant and legally male. Several studies indicate a lack of awareness, services, and medical assistance available to pregnant trans men. Inaccessibility to these services may lead to difficulty in finding comfortable and supportive services concerning prenatal care, as well as an increased risk for unsafe or unhealthy practices.

Medical discrimination and lack of provider knowledge inhibits pregnant transgender peoples access to timely and effective treatment. One pregnant trans man in Sweden was forced to wait in the emergency department while experiencing premature labor until it was "too late" because the staff did not believe a man could be pregnant. An American trans man delivered a stillborn in 2019 after presenting to the emergency department with elevated blood pressure and signs of labor; he waited hours to see a doctor.

=== Abortion ===
The prevalence and experiences of transgender, gender expansive, and non-binary people with abortion is understudied. Unintended pregnancies can result in transgender men or nonbinary people considering or attempting self-induced abortion. Many transgender men report attempting a self-induced abortion because of lack of safe, effective abortion methods. Studies differ on abortion rates in trans men. Different studies report that between 12% and 21% of trans people's pregnancies end in abortions. Some trans people report choosing between abortion and suicide because pregnancy causes them intolerable gender dysphoria.

=== Statistics ===
According to figures compiled by Medicare in Australia, one of the few national surveys as of 2020, 75 male-identified people gave birth naturally or via C-section in the country in 2016, and 40 in 2017.

== Trans women ==
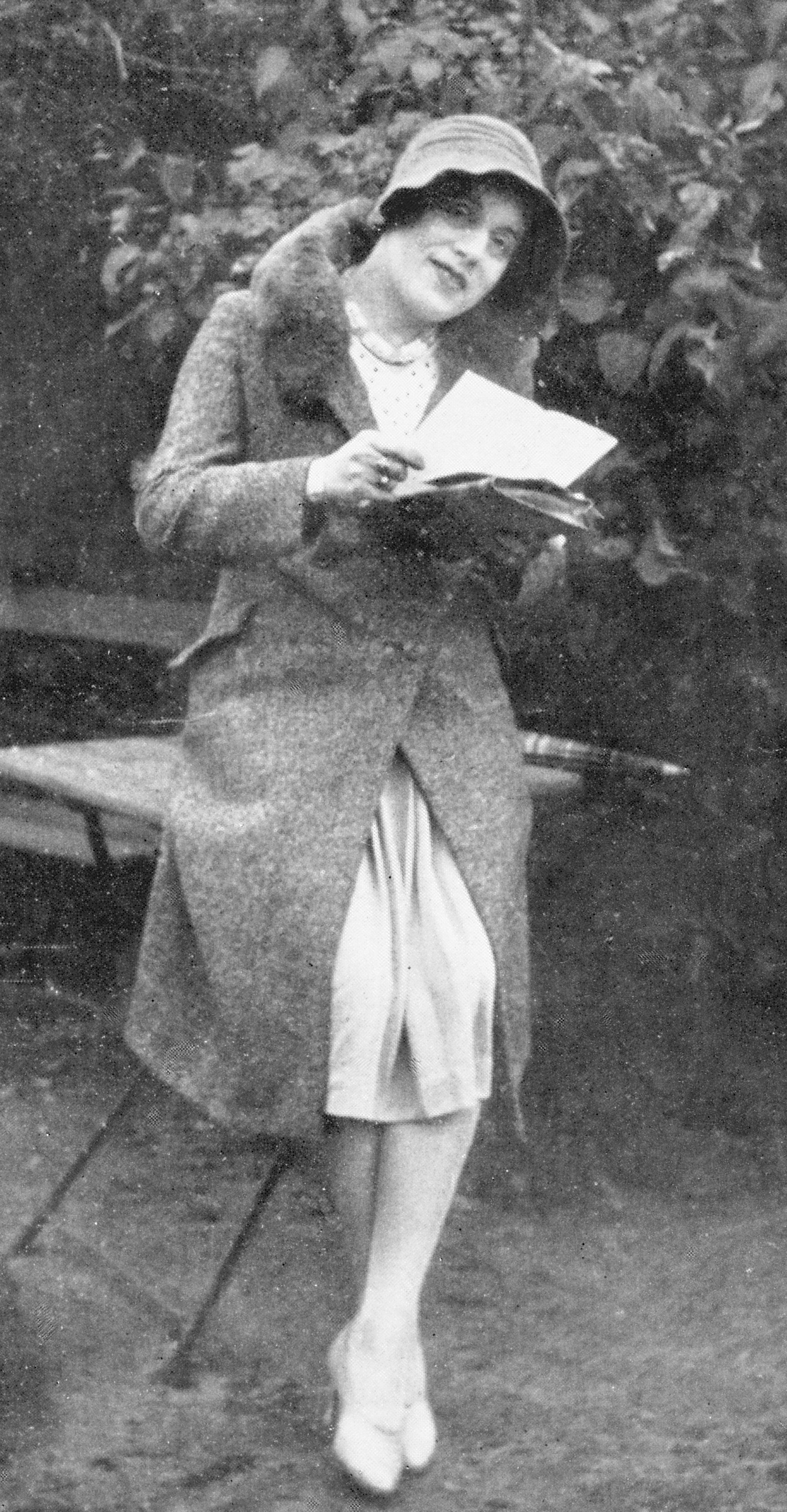
Lili Elbe in October 1930, a year before her death from a rejected uterus transplant

Pregnancy is not yet possible for transgender women who lack a uterus capable of supporting gestation. As of 2019, uterus transplantation has not been successfully performed in transgender women. The Danish transgender painter Lili Elbe died in 1931 from immune rejection following a uterus transplant operation. Modern uterus transplants typically require the patient to take anti-rejection medication until gestation is complete.

Uterine transplantation, or UTx, is in its infancy and is not yet publicly available. As of 2019, in cisgender women, more than 42 UTx procedures had been performed, with 12 live births resulting from the transplanted uteri as of publication. The International Society of Uterine Transplantation (ISUTx) was established internationally in 2016, with 70 clinical doctors and scientists, and currently has 140 intercontinental delegates.

In 2012, McGill University published the "Montreal Criteria for the Ethical Feasibility of Uterine Transplantation", a proposed set of criteria for carrying out uterine transplants, in Transplant International. Under these criteria, and because no research has been conducted in karyotypically male individuals, only karyotypically female individuals were considered to be a transplant recipient. The exclusion of trans women from candidacy was justified by the lack of research to determine how to conduct the surgery, rather than an inherent bar. In 2021, authors of the Montreal Criteria published a revised set of criteria in Bioethics with an ethical framework for consideration of karyotypic XY individuals' eligibility for uterine transplants. Additionally, there have been several cases of XY individuals with Swyer syndrome who have successfully hosted pregnancies. There have also been successful uterus transplants in male rats.

=== Breastfeeding ===
Some trans women can induce lactation, enabling them to breastfeed babies they did not birth. Practices such as medical lactation induction can stimulate the changes of breasts during pregnancy and begin lactation with the assistance of medication.

== Non-binary people ==
Non-binary people with a functioning female reproductive system can give birth.

Nonbinary people taking testosterone to transition must interrupt HRT in order to carry the pregnancy, as testosterone is a teratogen. Unintended pregnancies by non-binary people on testosterone therapy may be more common if they are on a low dose of testosterone. Nonbinary parents choose whether to be called "mom", "dad", or newly coined gender-neutral or nonbinary titles.

Non-binary people who have written or been profiled about their experiences of pregnancy include Rory Mickelson, Braiden Schirtzinger, and Mariah MacCarthy.

== History ==
=== 1600s – Britain ===
The first mention of a pregnancy resembling that of a transgender one in the United States and Britain was written about in The Male and Female Husband in 1682 by Henry Fielding, an English author. In this fictional pamphlet, Fielding recounts the story of Mary Jewit, an intersex person who was raised by a midwife as a woman until Mary impregnated their female partner. Their partner gave birth to their child, and Mary was sentenced by trial to marry their lover and continue the rest of their life as a man.

=== 1800s – US ===
In 1852, Joseph Lobdell, an American author, became pregnant with his only child. Lobdell was assigned female at birth but he was socialized by his father as a boy and was regarded as a man in his adult life. Joseph married a man named George Washington Slater, whilst presenting as a woman, and became pregnant with his child in 1852. Through his pregnancy, Lobdell maintained his masculinity as an important part of his identity. Although the term transgender was not used prior to the 20th century, many scholars agree that Lobdell lived the experience of what we now would refer to as a transgender man with a transgender pregnancy.

=== Early 2000s – US ===
In 2008, a Oregonian transgender man named Thomas Beatie gave birth to his daughter despite the social, medical, and physical roadblocks he faced. Beatie and his wife Nancy wanted a child, however, since she was unable to conceive due to prior medical complications, Beatie went off of HRT and became pregnant with the help of a sperm donor. Beatie's pregnancy was widely reported on by outlets such as CBS and ABC, often receiving mixed opinions from the public while opening up conversations around transgender pregnancies in the modern era. Beatie is widely referred to as the first pregnant man but his story resonated with transgender people in the US at this time, inferring that Beatie was not alone in his struggle navigating systems for pregnant transgender people.

== Society and culture ==
"Pregnant man" and "pregnant person" emojis displayed in Noto Color Emoji

In 2021, Unicode approved the "pregnant man" and "pregnant person" emojis in version 14.0, and added to Emoji 14.0. Additionally, these emojis are used in a humorous sense to refer to the feeling of being very full after a large meal.

== See also ==
- Transgender rights
- LGBT parenting
- LGBT reproduction
- Male pregnancy
- Engineered uterus
- Menstruation among transgender people
- Birth control in transgender people
