= Alanya Alaaddin Keykubat University =

Public university in Antalya, Turkey

- Alanya Alaaddin Keykubat Üniversitesi
- University logo
- Motto: Biz kökleri mazide, hedefleri atide olan bir üniversiteyiz
- Type: Public university
- Established: 23 April 2015
- Rector: Prof. Dr. Kenan Ahmet Türkdoğan
- Students: 15,081 (2023–24)
- Undergraduates: 9,022 (2023–24)
- Postgraduates: 511 (2023–24)
- Doctoral students: 93 (2023–24)
- Location: Kestel Mahallesi, Üniversite Caddesi No: 80, Alanya/Antalya, Alanya, Antalya, Turkey; 36.550°N 32.000°E
- Campus: Alanya (Kestel)
- Language: Turkish, English
- Colors: Turquoise and Navy Blue
- Website: www.alanya.edu.tr

Alanya Alaaddin Keykubat University is a public university located in Alanya, Antalya Province, Turkey. It was established by law published in the Official Gazette on April 23, 2015, and is named after the Anatolian Seljuk Sultan Alaaddin Keykubat.

As of the 2023–2024 academic year, the university hosts a total of 15,081 students: 9,022 undergraduates, 511 graduate students, and 93 doctoral students. The university offers a diverse range of undergraduate and graduate programs across its faculties and vocational schools. The academic staff comprises 59 professors, 75 associate professors, 180 assistant professors, 172 lecturers, and 131 research assistants, totaling 617 academic personnel. The current rector is Prof. Dr. Kenan Ahmet Türkdoğan.

== Academic Units ==
=== Faculties ===
- Faculty of Education
- Faculty of Economics, Administrative and Social Sciences
- Rafet Kayış Faculty of Engineering
- Gazipaşa Faculty of Aviation and Space Sciences
- Faculty of Health Sciences
- Faculty of Sport Sciences
- Faculty of Art, Design and Architecture
- Faculty of Tourism
- Faculty of Dentistry
- Faculty of Medicine

=== Vocational Schools ===
- Akseki Vocational School
- Alanya Chamber of Commerce and Industry Vocational School
- Alanya Chamber of Commerce and Industry Tourism Vocational School
- Vocational School of Health Services
- Gazipaşa Mustafa Rahmi Büyükballı Vocational School
- School of Foreign Languages

=== Graduate Institute ===
- Institute of Graduate Education
