= Corn harvester =

Machine used to harvest corn

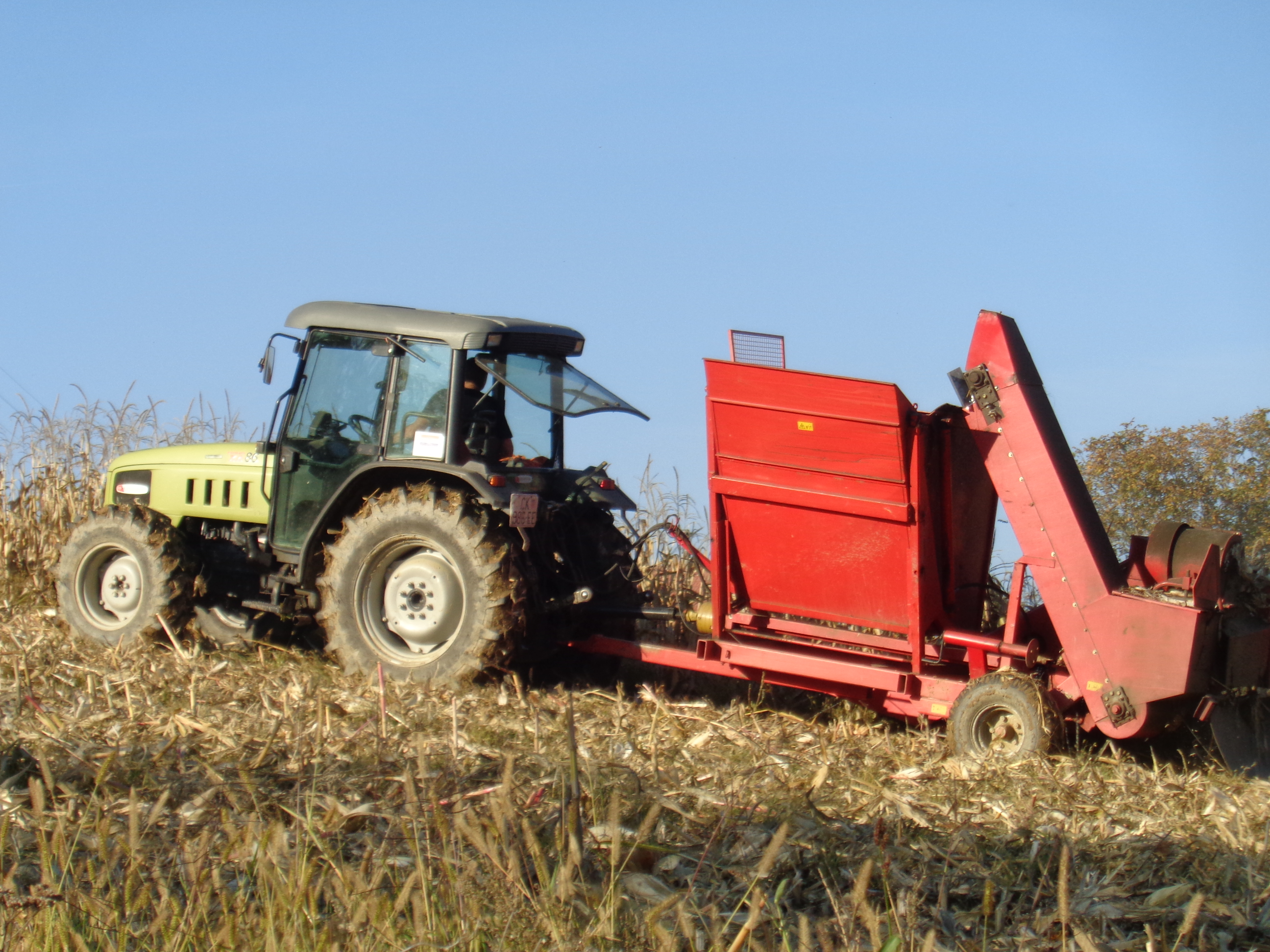
A kind of corn harvester used in Croatia

A corn harvester is a machine used on farms to harvest corn, stripping the stalks about one foot from the ground shooting the stalks through the header to the ground. The corn is stripped from its stalk and then moves through the header to the intake conveyor belt. From there it goes up the conveying system through a fan system, separating the remaining stalks from the ears. The stalks blow out the fan duct into the field while the ears ride an elevator to a hopper trailer.

This method is done with both fresh corn and seed corn.

== History ==
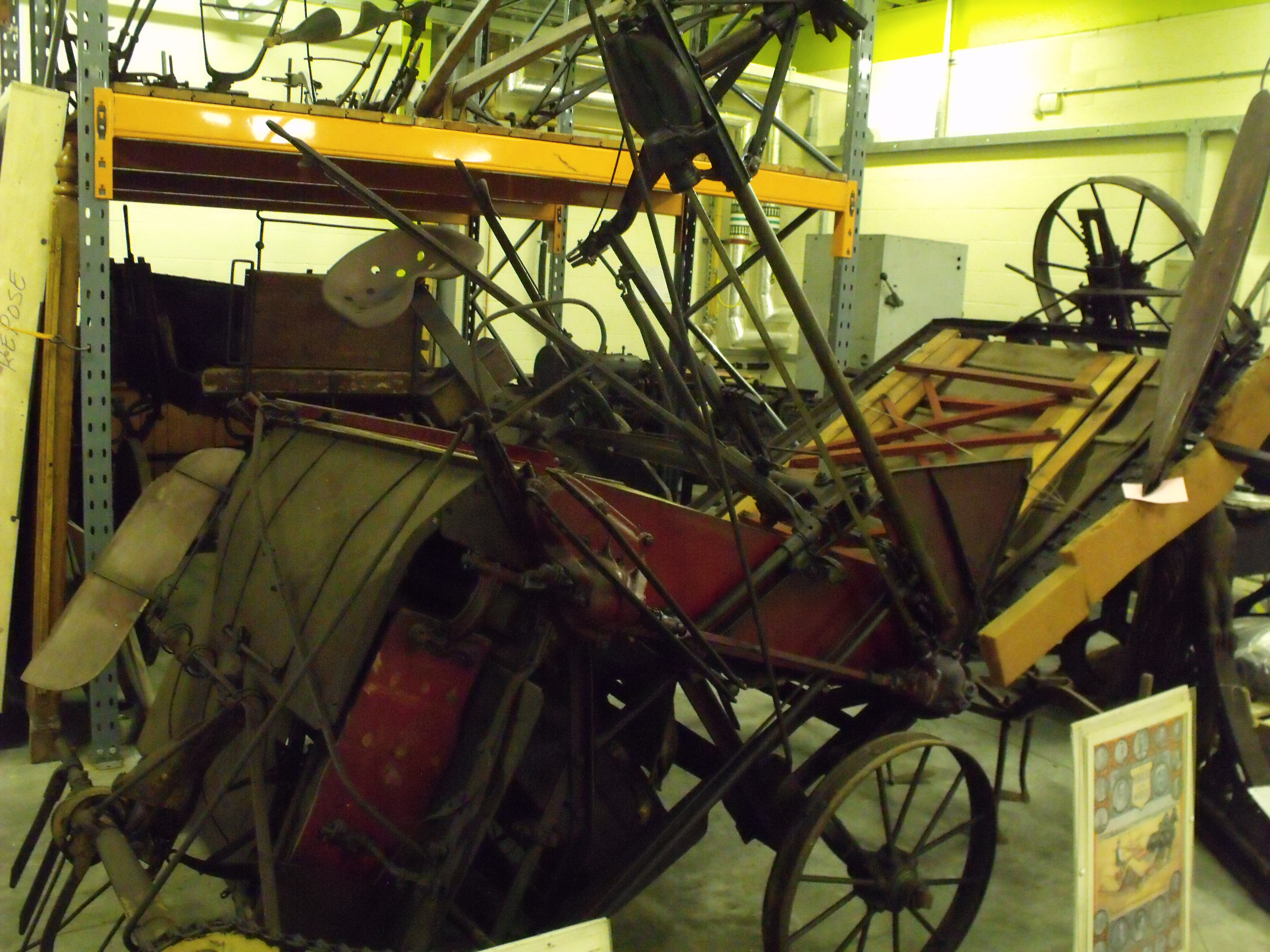
Made by Massey-Harris in 1930 this horse-drawn machine cut the corn and bound it into sheaves.

Corn was initially harvested by hand picking. This labor intensive process commonly included the work of family members. Developed in the 1870s, the horse-drawn corn binder cut corn stalks and tied them in bundles. Small farmers continued to use the corn knife. A good picker could harvest up to an acre a day.

The first mechanical corn harvester was developed in 1930 by Gleaner Harvester Combine Corporation of Independence, Missouri. The unit was pulled by a tractor with the unit on the left side. Field shelling increased in the 1950s with attachments for mechanical pickers. With agricultural mechanization expanding processing capacity, farmers with large acreages were the first to purchase combines.

By the 1990s, a self-propelled combine could harvest 50 acres of corn a day. Manufacturers consolidated into a few large firms such as John Deere and CNH Industrial. The integration of GPS into combine harvesters in the early 2000s enabled precision agriculture.

== Types ==
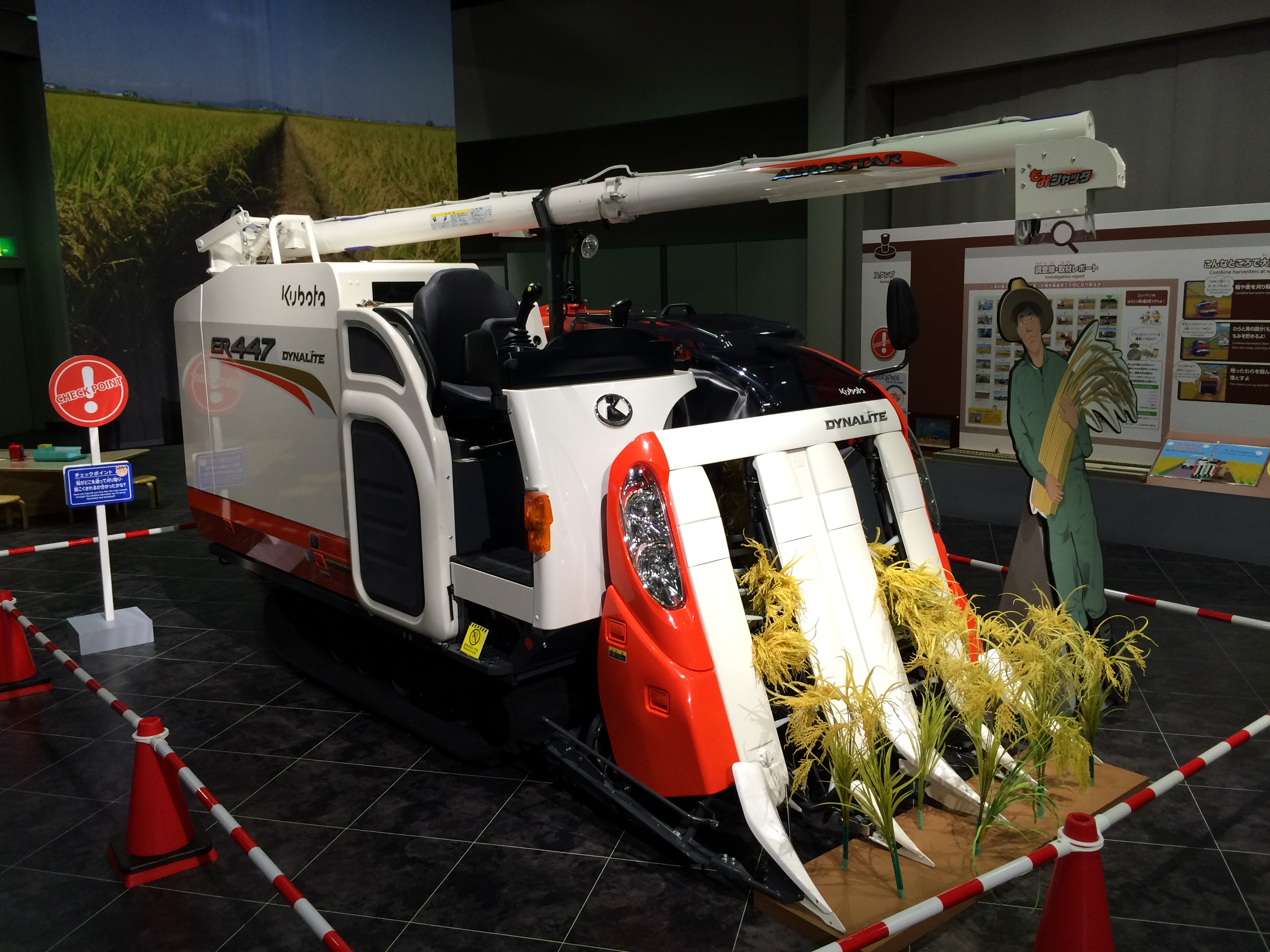
Kubota corn harvester (Japan), in the Toyota Automobile Museum

Pull-type harvesters are designed for integration with tractors through power take-off. The PTO shaft typically operates at 540 or 1000 RPM speeds.

Self-propelled harvesters have their own independent engines. They combine all technological operations including cutting, separating, cleaning, and collecting. This allows for rapid harvesting of crops.

== Modern technology ==
Modern combine harvester machines use GPS and AI for autonomous operation and enhancing productivity. Machine vision can detect obstacles and reduce human intervention.

In precision agriculture, sensors allow collection of real-time data and creation of detailed maps on the spatial variability of measured variables. With fertilizer runoff causing dead zones, variable rate fertilizer can reduce environmental effects.

In 2025, John Deere released new combine headers, featuring an 18-row corn head intended to enhance productivity.

Repair costs are high with extreme variation. Protests about repair monopolies show demand for right to repair legislation.
