= Diane Rodríguez =

Ecuadorian activist and politician (born 1982)

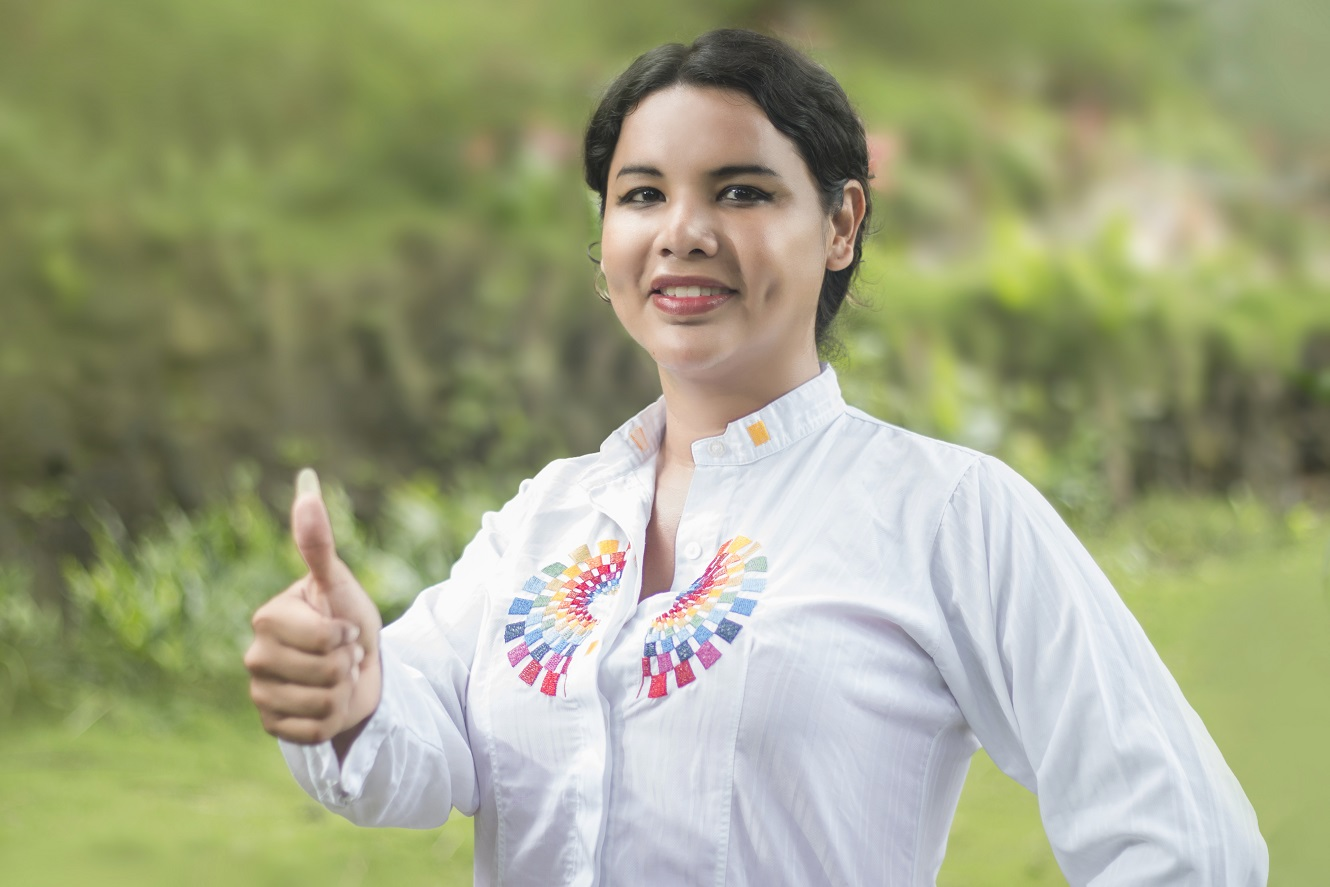
- Rodríguez in 2017

Alternate member of the National Assembly of Ecuador
- In office 17 May 2017 – 17 May 2021
- Constituency: Guayas Province

Personal details
- Born: 16 March 1982 (age 44) Guayaquil, Ecuador
- Party: PAIS Alliance
- Spouse: Fernando Machado
- Children: Sununu Machado Rodríguez (2016); Villamarié Elías Rodríguez (2021)
- Education: Universidad de Guayaquil

Diane Marie Rodríguez Zambrano (Spanish: [diˈane roˈdɾiɡes]; born 16 March 1982) is an Ecuadorian activist and politician who focuses on human rights and LGBTQ rights in Ecuador. She is the transgender chairwoman of the Silhouette X Association and a representative of the Observatory LGBTI of Ecuador. In 2009, she created a legal precedent in favor of the transgender population, to sue the Civil Registry to change her birth name to her present name. In 2017, she was elected as the first trans member of the National Assembly of Ecuador, and the second LGBT member after Sandra Alvarez Monsalve, who was elected as an alternate assembly member in 2009. She completed her mandate in 2021.

== Biography ==
=== Early life ===
In 2000, at the age of 17, she began her work as an activist with the now-defunct foundation Amigos por la Vida (Friends for Life) in the city of Guayaquil. She was initially the Secretary to the Foundation's president in this volunteer organization. After a year, she began to connect with other NGO youth groups. She championed with other young LGBTI the processes related to sexual orientation and HIV/AIDS in the first bill of youth, promoted at the time by the "House of Youth" of the old Ministry of "social welfare" of Ecuador.

After several years, she directly contacted the Kimirina Corporation to participate as a field researcher in the "Needs Assessment" in transgender populations which would reaffirm their hypothesis of the situational state of transgender people in those years. The results of the study were published after a year.

She developed LGBT activist rights in Ecuador while she was in college studying Commercial Engineering. She left in her second year due to bullying at the various companies where she worked.

=== Community-based organization ===
In 2006, with the support of the "transgender project" of Quito, she created in the city of Guayaquil the community-based organization (CBO): "Future Community", an organization that focuses on specialized local activism for gender identity. This proposal arose from the confusion and the need of its founders to separate the issues: sexual orientation and gender identity. The organization failed after six months due to "Gaytriarchy - gaytriarcado" (a portmanteau of gay and patriarchy coined by Diane Rodriguez in 2012) that made their work illegitimate.

=== Silueta X ===
After serving for 26 years, she created the girl group "Silhouette X" (Silueta X), whose name comes from the questioning before the system Kish-Straight. The activities of this group had such an impact that they had an interview in the Daily Spectator of Colombia that discussed trans and intersex activism in Ecuador.

In 2010 the project "Social inclusion of young transgender people to be trained in micro-enterprises, decreasing poverty, sex work and proliferation HIV/AIDS" was approved, which gave the opportunity to legally register the organization and pass the "Girl Group Silhouette X" to "Silueta X Association".

== Activism ==
=== Legal advocacy ===
In 2008, while working in the "Hotel Oro Verde" of Guayaquil, she was unexpectedly fired by the hotel chain. Although it was the 3rd company that had done this to Diane Rodriguez, she had never filed a legal complaint due to a lack of knowledge of the laws, which allowed her to file a legal complaint against the company for employment discrimination. It is speculated that it was employment discrimination because the day before the group Silueta X developed a panel with the Kimirina Corporation and the "Ministry of Economic and Social Inclusion of Ecuador" entitled: "Increasing HIV/AIDS awareness in transgender youth" and the event "the transgender and their capabilities", held at the zonal government of Guayaquil. The events were covered by various media and Diane Rodriguez publicly participated (at that time as a transvestite). Diane Rodriguez followed a legal process to sue the hotel, creating a precedent in Ecuador, in which an LGBT individual filed a discrimination lawsuit against a private company.

The legal battle continued until 2009. Rodriguez was not seeking damages or compensation, but only to be reinstated to her old job as a cashier, and to have her gender identity respected at work. Public hearings from the ombudsman and the hotel were prolonged but indicated that they could not accept it because her self-identification as a woman did not match her legal identity.

The legal requirements of the hotel to reinstate her to work drove her to implement the campaign: "Females with Female Names", unleashing the legal implications of trans issues interest in this country. The "Constitution of the Republic of Ecuador" of 2008 in its favour; which first entered the "gender identity" initiates a legal complaint against the "civil status" because it denies the request to change their names from male to female.

Her second legal battle resulted in her favor, after several internal adjustments of the "Civil Registration" with the Ombudsman in February 2009, making this achievement in the first legal precedent in the Republic of Ecuador in transgender identity. A law was created to establish access for transgender, transsexual and intersex people to change their names from masculine to feminine or vice versa.

After partially meeting the legal demands of the hotel company, she continued with the first-filed legal complaint, ignoring the change of its female names for later testimony in open court, that the hotel had economic problems and was downsizing. This stalled the process of the employment discrimination complaint because they could not incorporate it to work, by economic arguments. The hotel promised to locate another company for Diane Rodriguez, but that never materialized. Later, another complaint was presented to the Ombudsman's Office, where it was found that the hotel, months after the legal process, was in search of new cashiers to work in the same hotel company. The case continues and is still open, and there is no legal resolution from the Ombudsman's Office of Ecuador.

Completing this year, through a protective action against the Civil Registration, another legal process starts on this occasion to demand recognition of their female gender identity, sponsored by the Ombudsman's Office. However, months after she was denied the action for defense by the first civil court. The judicial record of the complaint, after this result, instead of continuing to the provincial court, stagnates when dilated by the Ombudsman's Office, lost her case for sex change in the identity card, after a couple of years.

=== Impact Media ===
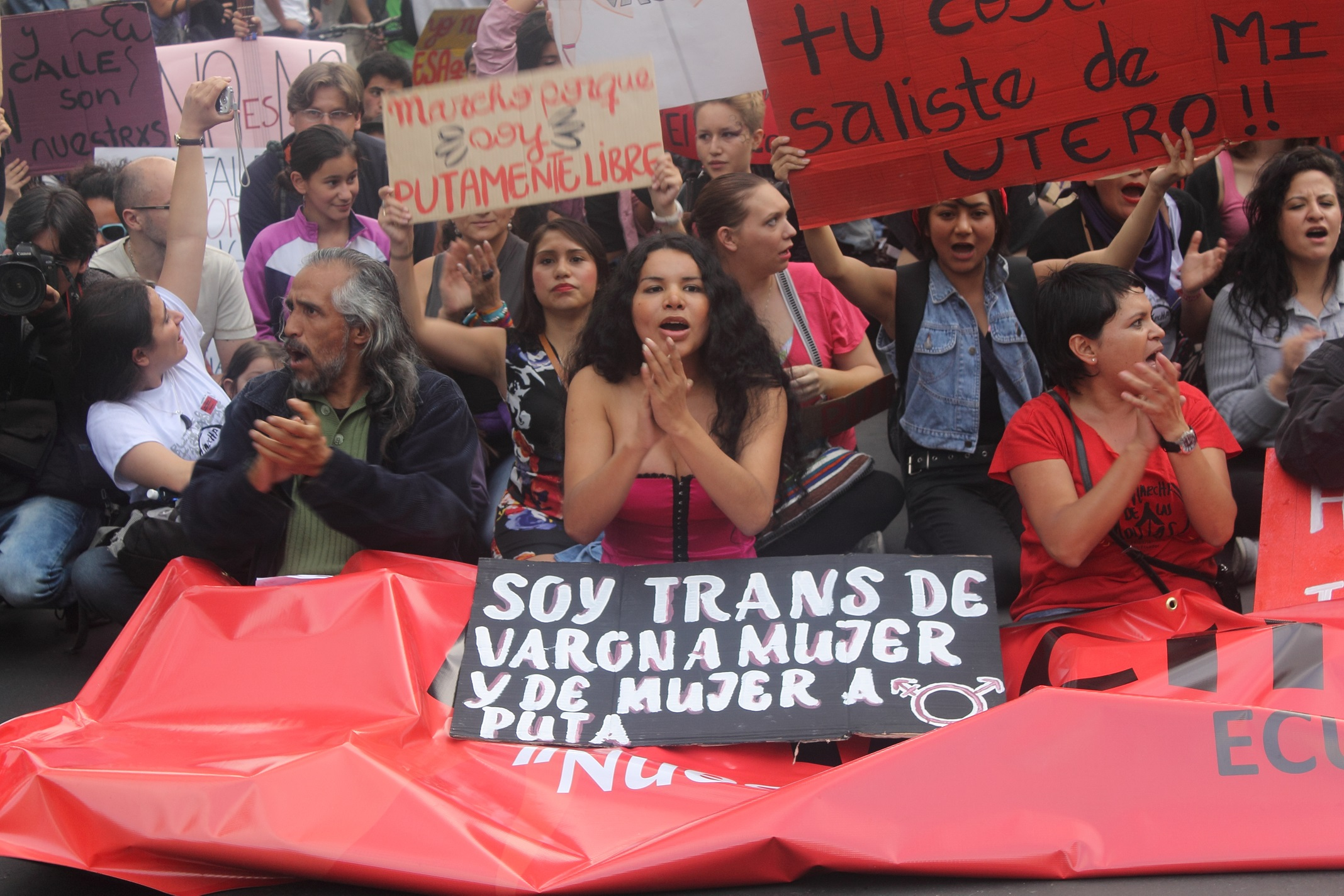
Diane Rodriguez protesting sexism, 2014

For the first time, after having had a bad report with the Extra Journal in 2009 with the headline "I'm going to marry a black and adopt 3 children" whereby Diane Rodriguez, made public her complaint against daily newspaper, comes to an agreement with it, to make "positive report about Silueta X" which initially started nine transgender members of Silueta X, with points in the photographic studio of the Journal, and subsequently standardized good stories, not only in that environment, but it influenced the context.

The initial aim was to position the trans issue within the country through the medium of communication that was most widely read as this environment, achieving in this way the visibility of activities inherent to LGBTI issues, as no other media had done. Later an awards ceremony, where the biggest winner was the medium who had previously had disputes was made.

=== Impact on authorities ===
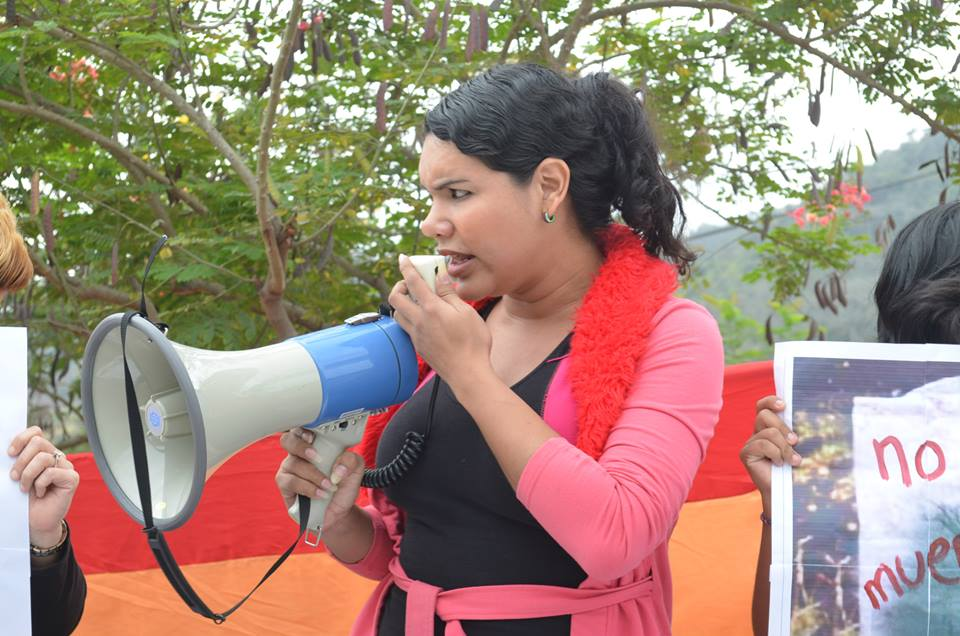
Diane Rodriguez, protesting against one of the state apparatus, 2013

In development 2010 complained to the authorities and had media uptake on the Census population of INEC (National Institute of Statistics and Censuses) of Ecuador, due to the lack of advice and unwillingness to register in the same populations LGBTI, especially those transgender, that having been born in one sex and living in another gender. The trans and intersex endpoint was in great demand as identified as the man born and living as women or vice versa, is to falsify information. The demands sustained that trans and intersex people do not belong to either, getting lost in that census the opportunity to make a statistic LGBTI. In the same year, conducted the study "Psychosocial about sex work among transgender and transsexual youth 15 to 29 years in the city of Guayaquil during 2010", which had an impact locally. Regarding their results, due to the approach to prostitution trans

It lapsing 2011 Diane Rodriguez, got the attention of the Ministry of Interior and the police community, by proposing a joint effort with the transgender population. The approach is part of the various complaints of trans partners who performed sex work, and who expressed the abuse of some policemen. Thus begins the inter-institutional agreements with the authorities and get to the first "awareness workshops of sexuality and gender", in order to reduce stigma and discrimination against prostitutes and transgender sex workers in Guayaquil.

=== Social impact ===
==== Victor Victoria ====
In 2009, with several organizations led by the Kimirina corporation, Diane Rodriguez gave life to the first comics or preventive character transgender, which she called "Victor Victoria".

The magazine was intended to give the necessary attention to the transgender population in the different aspects of everyday life such as health, education, employment, and violence, including trans specificities. Publication of the journal was kept for two years in a row, reaching the trans population in general.

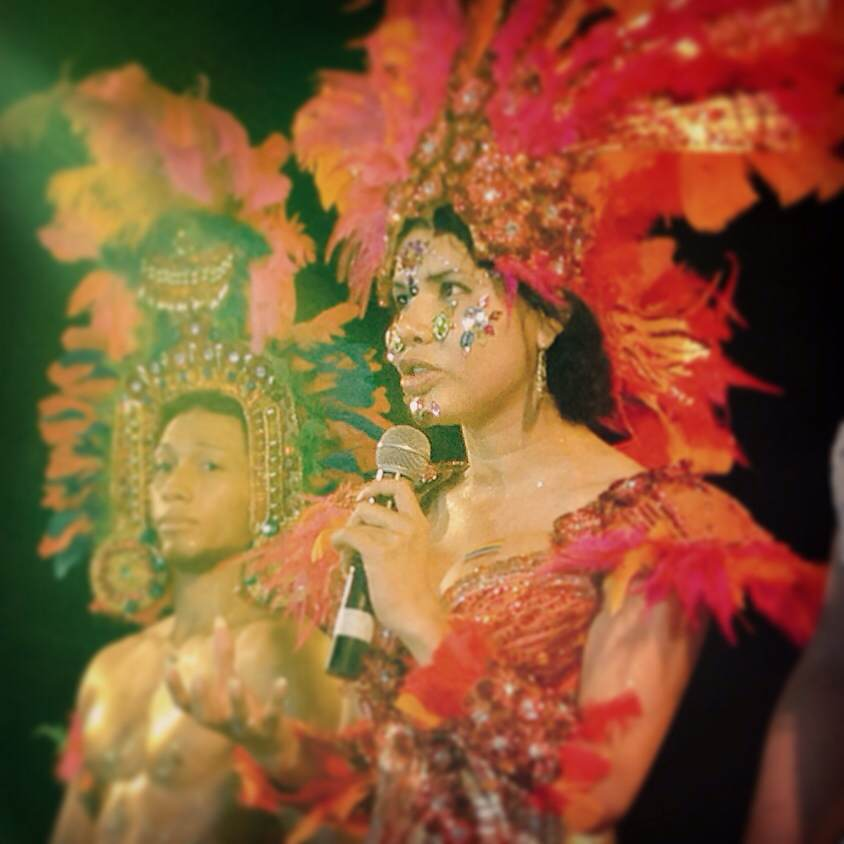
Rodriguez in 2014

==== My gender My ID card ====
Rodríguez launched the "My Gender on my ID Card" campaign (Mi Género Mi Cédula in Spanish)", with the Project Transgender, CONFETRANS, Peppermint Foundation, Articulation feminist building equality and Silueta X Association, in order to land the Article 11 paragraph 2 of the constitution of the Republic of Ecuador on reforms to the Act Civil Registration. Such demands for gender identity, born after a legal complaint filed by the civil registry for sex change in the identity, then the Ombudsman of Quito, indicated that his proceedings against the registry so that your gender is recognized in the identity card were lost, dilation

The "My gender on my identity card" campaign - a point of exercising citizenship, had a positive impact on the Ecuadorian context and in the assembly, which in the first instance the whole, the bill passed with 75% in favor in December 2012. However, now the bill is suspended, with the possibility to be vetoed. This new panorama, born to confusion by far-right groups with the theme of gay marriage, which although is another important topic for LGBTI, had nothing to do whatsoever with the amendments to the Act Civil Registry.

==== It's time for equality ====
Rodríguez launched the campaign in June 2013, "It's time for equality, for freedom from discrimination Ecuador" ("Es Tiempo de Igualdad, pour un Ecuador Libre de Discriminación" in Spanish), which aims to reduce stigma and discrimination in the country. Thanks to this campaign several complaints like Zulema Constant, Sara Solórzano, and Dennise Freire, related to LGBTI torture clinics or homosexualization, in an attempt of sexual diversity groups, stop the violence and torture emerge Ellos.

==== LGBTI Medical Centre ====
In May 2013 launched the first psycho-medical for gays, lesbians, bisexuals, intersex, and transgender people in Ecuador. Her teammates in honor of her work called her "Diane Rodriguez" at a public event with safe and state authorities. This safe center is the first of its kind because it has specialized for LGBTI groups, especially on the issue of gender identity medicine, which has been evident for years its lack of attention, including at Mundial. and also with psychological support, issues of sexual diversity.

=== Advocacy ===
==== Civil disobedience ====
Declares 7 May 2011, in "civil disobedience", to be selected by the CNE-National Electoral Board as 3rd Member of the Board #137 of Men to be violent their right to sexual privacy, and the free development of their personality. Your claim arises from the refusal of the CNE, not to relocate at a meeting of women. The public response from the CNE, does not satisfy the expectations of an activist being forced to self-declare in civil disobedience.

==== Board males ====
In February 2013 her gender was denied when expected to vote while designated as a man. Despite being the 2nd time the CNE did not pay attention to her claims, this time defrayed with the same arrogance that led her political campaign as the first transgender candidate in that country.

=== Political rally ===
==== Movement Political Alianza País ====
In 2010, her political process started in parallel with others’ activism, participating in the political spaces of young people in the leftist "Alianza País". Also, she maintained active participation in the youth movement to the point of being considered representative LGBTI at that time.

In the year 2011 along with several young "Alianza País" on the premises of the collective "Movimiento Alfarista-Bolivaariano" formed the Committee of the Citizen Revolution (Comité de la Revolución Ciudadana in Spanish) "Youth for National transformation", with whom begins to develop activities located in demand for youth groups political movement. Is selected as part of the management committee of the newly formed citizen's revolution.

==== Movement Political Ruptura 25 ====
Meet María Paula Romo, high representative of the political movement Breakdown 25 (Ruptura 25 in Spanish) - previously signed by the Alliance Country "Country Agreement" - on the outskirts of the University of Guayaquil, with Francisco Jiménez, Guayas ex-Gobernador, who were collecting signatures for the legalization movement. Together with a fellow activist, was invited to attend meetings of the political movement Guayaquil.

Since 2012, and after having dabbled repeatedly in the ideologies of the movement activists are openly involved in it. The directory is part of this movement, even legally for registration with the national electoral council for the province of Guayas.

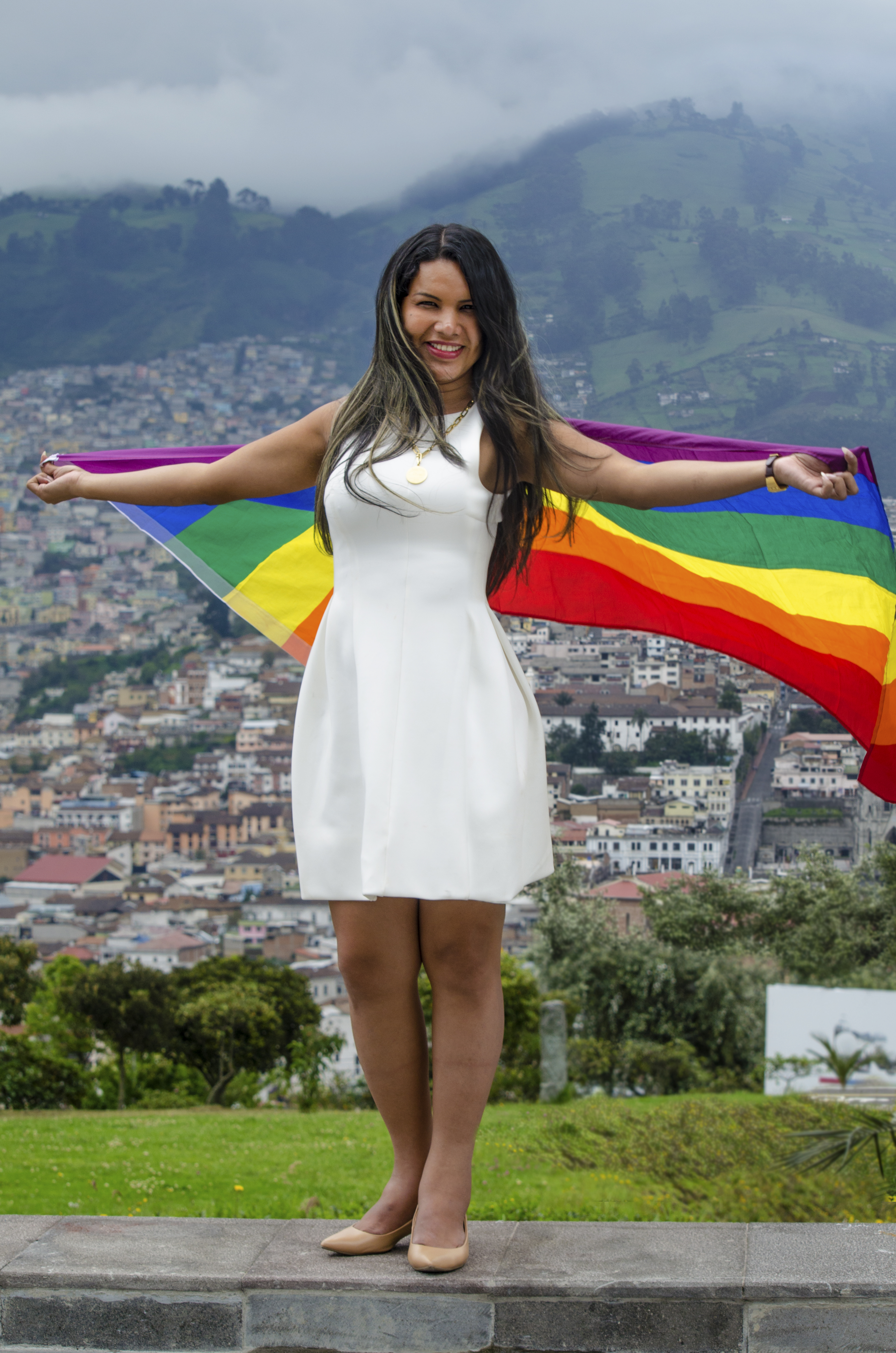
Rodríguez in 2019

==== Candidacy ====
In October 2012, the general assembly of "Ruptura 25", is nominated in the primaries as a possible candidate for the province of Guayas. This was completed during the nominations of candidates for that month to the delegate "Electoral National Council" who voted for her nomination unanimously. Leaves the country for an emergency that causes problems for her candidacy to be denied registration by the CNE (National Electoral Council) for "legal uncertainty", introducing the authorized copy of the identity card, and witnessing the institution of male and female names. With original documents, members of "Ruptura 25", managed to enroll no more drawbacks Diane Rodriguez raised that, while ignoring the legal uncertainty now revealing the identity of the activist, having female names with gender Masculino. Diane Rodriguez led a campaign with few resources receiving external support as spots, videos, etc... motivated by the activism.

==== Strife policy ====
During the political campaign, she had several impasses with the presidential candidate and evangelist Nelson Zavala, who repeatedly dismissed her participation, for reasons ranging from more fundamentalist to religious. In view of the different statements against Conservative candidate Diane Rodriguez, the national electoral Council developed a contingency plan which includes "hate crimes" during the campaign. Thus, the electoral body was still on the presidential candidate process judicial candidate against Nelson Zavala, culminating in the elimination of its civil rights and politicians within one year and pay a fine of 3120 dollars. This achievement, the first of its kind in Latin America became well regarded, it even won a contest in international law, as the first of its kind.

==== Results ====
At the end of the campaign, Diane Rodriguez defrayed in a row of men, despite their public claims to the CNE to make it meet the standard of women.

The official results of the political movements were declared on March 15, 2013, where it was confirmed that anyone candidate of the movement "Ruptura 25", was able to secure a seat for the assembly, including of course Diane Rodríguez. The political movement of the government "Alianza Pais", won more than 100 seats in the assembly, reaching an overwhelming majority in the new period terminating in 2017.

=== Presidency of Ecuador ===
==== Message from the President ====
On 19 March 2013, after her candidacy and again and completely dedicated to civil activism, re-elected president Rafael Correa Delgado, sent a tweet the transgender ex-candidate Assemblywoman, which expressed "Dear Diane, I just wanted to say that I admire and respect deeply, but do not share all its principles."

==== Invitation president ====
In May 2013, a special treat, which makes the president of Ecuador to the first activist LGBTI for change the "Presidential Guard" from his new period, a civic act of high importance, in particular, Carondelet.

==== The Historical Meeting LGBTI ====
During the invitation by President Rafael Correa to Diane Rodriguez in May 2013, she used the space to request a private meeting and expose the situational status of the population LGBTI of Ecuador. This particular meeting was on December 13, 2013, where the protocol activist jumped and took 8 reps of various conditions sex - Generic and various organizations and provinces of Ecuador, thus consecrating, "The Historical Meeting LGBTI between President Rafael Correa and the Collective of diversity Sexual".

This meeting concluded agreements essential for justice, health, education, and employment for the populations of the diversity of Ecuador, which eventually went from situational exposure to specific agreements. Some activists, particularly Homosexuals (Gays and Lesbians) Diane Rodriguez criticized for not having proposed "Equal Marriage" which from the perspective of the activist is a populist issue and contributes little to the basic needs of people various sexuality. It is noteworthy that the position of Diane Rodriguez is the deconstruction of the capitalist system, which prevents him from defending the "Equal Marriage" as a right, as she thinks more of its abolition.

This revolutionary ideology of Diane Rodriguez is similar to that of Beatriz Preciado, a Spanish philosopher recognized that contemporary criticism has broad claims, such as Gay Marriage: «The demand for legalization of gay marriage comes indirectly strengthen marriage as a condition of access to citizenship. Similarly, institutional programs to combat so-called "gender violence" contribute to the naturalization of the relationship between violence and masculinity, masking their own violence to marital and family structures (which are further reinforced by the demands of gay marriage)».

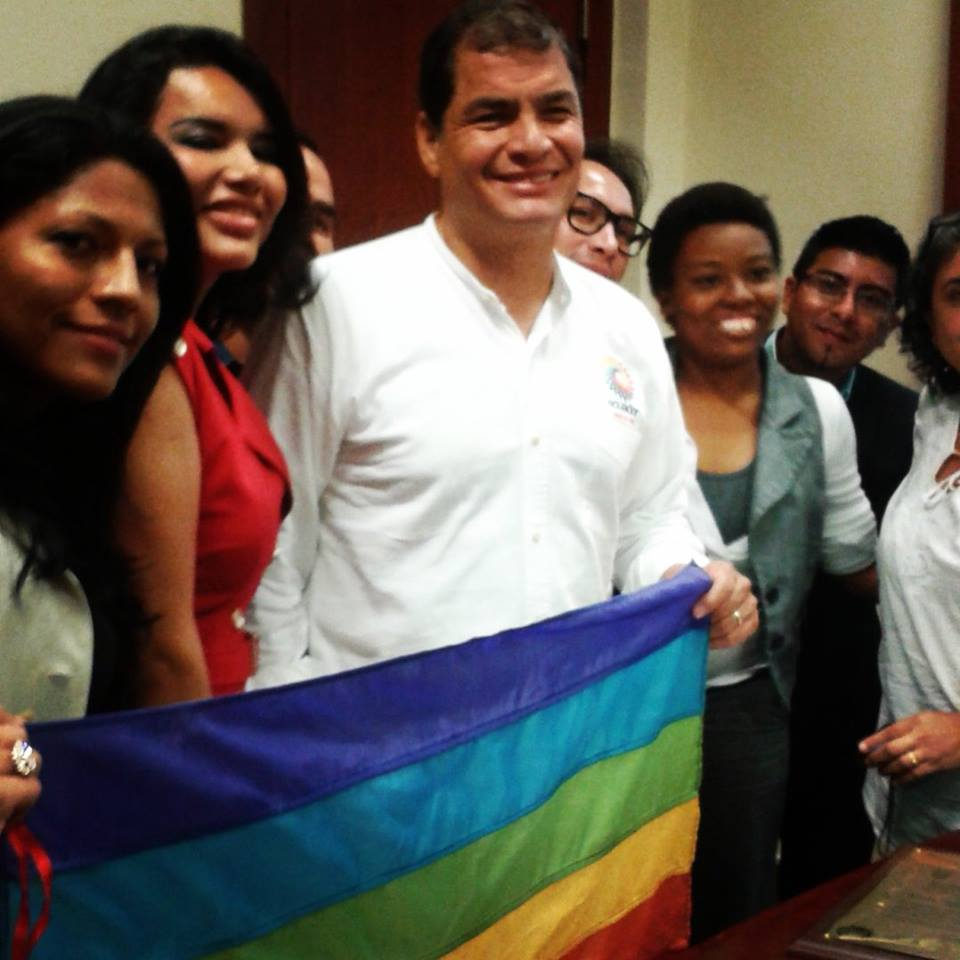
Historic Meeting with President Rafael Correa of Ecuador, led by Diane Rodriguez

The Historic Meeting with President Rafael Correa and 'sexual diversity', had a profound impact on the LGBTI populations in Ecuador, of which several media published as successful, and the president himself on the citizen bond 'December 14th' described it as productive.

== Personal life ==
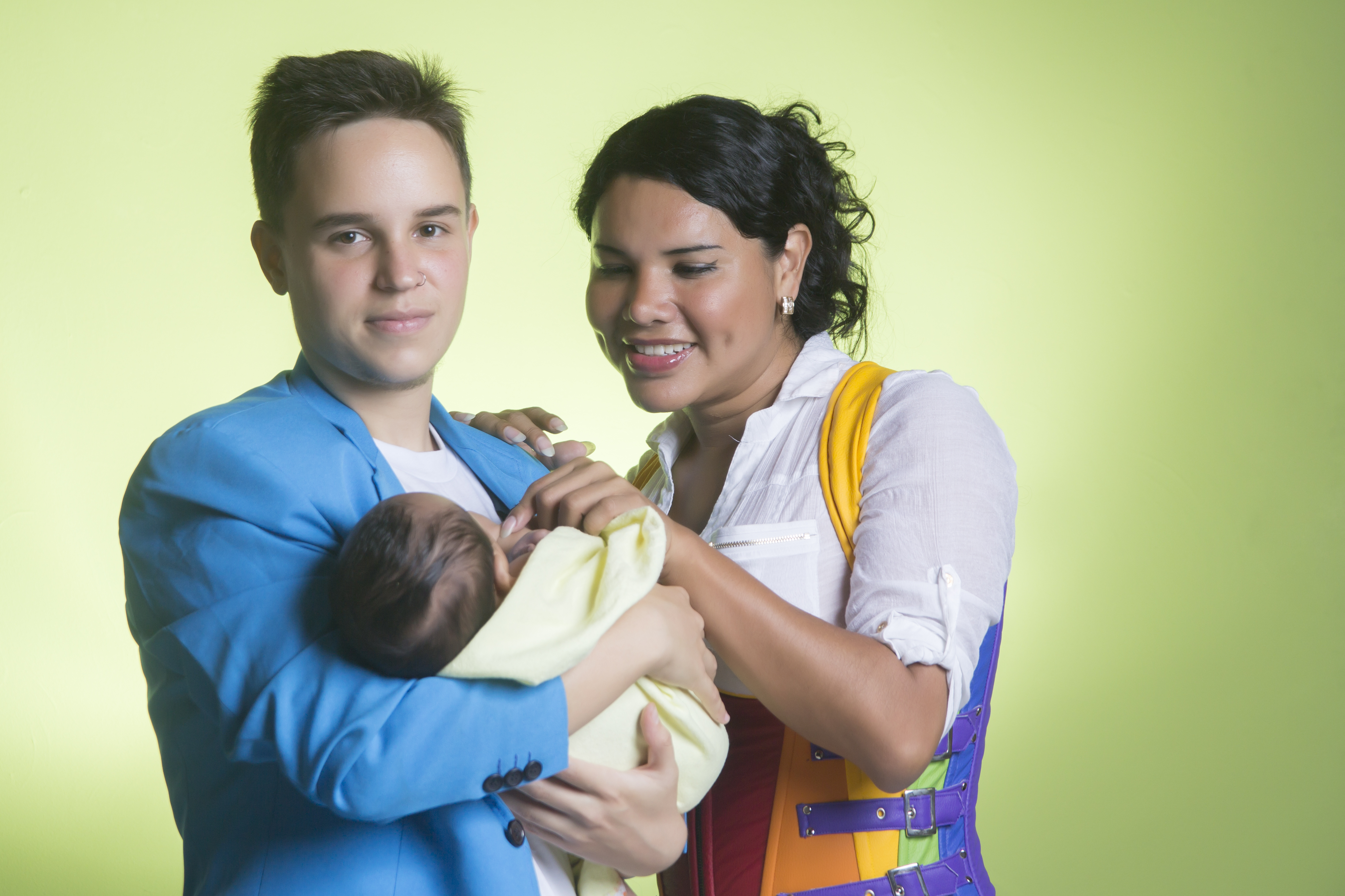
Rodriguez with her husband Fernando Machado and their child in 2016

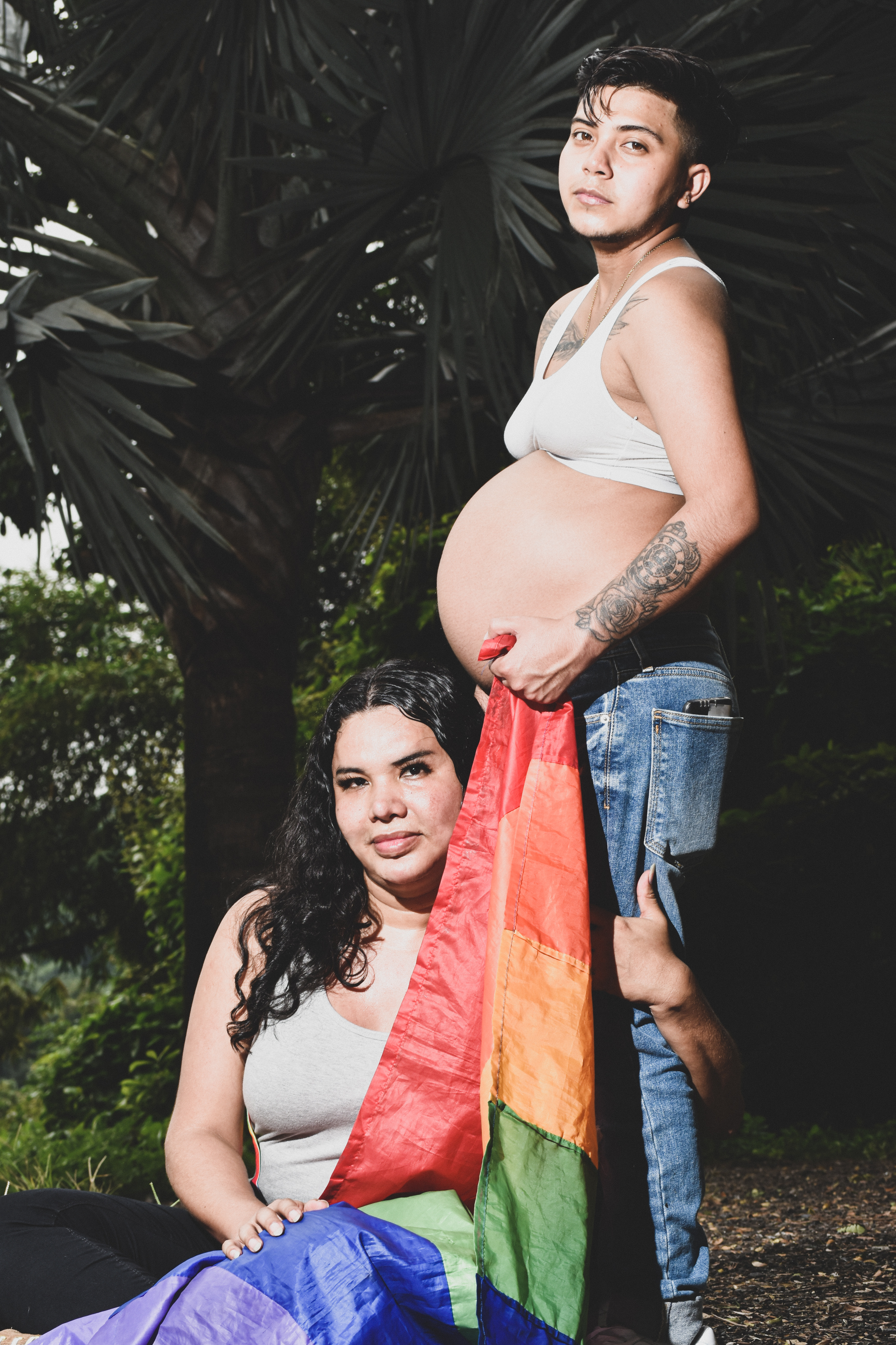
Diane Rodríguez and her Trans husband, Zack Elías, 2021

She married Fernando Machado, a South American transgender man. The couple have one child.

== International representation ==
- Cartagena de Indias (Colombia): Tercer encuentro iberoamericano de juventud "Carta joven 10" - El instituto de la juventud de España (INJUE), La organización Iberoamericana de Juventud (OIJ), la Fundación Carolina y la Agencia española de Cooperación internacional para el desarrollo (AECID), certifican su representación por Ecuador, octubre del 2010.
- Panama City (Panama): Taller regional “comprendiendo el fondo global” - La youth coalition, certifica su representación por Ecuador en junio del 2011.
- Cancún (Mexico): Cumbre iberoamericana de jóvenes líderes - Estado de Quintana Roo, La secretaría general iberoamericana y la OIJ certifican su destacada participación y representación por Ecuador, noviembre del 2011.
- Mexico City (Mexico): Women Deliver - Mujeres Dando a Luz certifica su destacada participación y debate en los temas de derechos sexuales y reproductivos de Latino américa, junio del 2012.
- São Paulo (Brazil): Consultoría Técnica Regional para la selección de proyectos Latinoamericanos - amfAR Aids research certifica su representación por Ecuador, agosto del 2012.
- Brasília (Brazil): "Conferencia contra la Homofobia" - El Ministerio de Relaciones Exteriores de Brasil, certifica su destacada participación en la conferencia, como antesala de la declaración de la ONU sobre orientación sexual e Identidad de Género. Marzo del 2013.
- Washington, D.C. (United States): Consultoría para la prevención de Riesgos en para PVVS y las nuevas tecnologías, Aids star one y amfAR certifican su representación por Ecuador, junio del 2013.
- Tegucigalpa (Honduras): Relatora especial en la red latinoamericana por la democracia y la comunicación de la Diversidad Sexual, RedLad certifica su destacada participación, junio 2013.
- Berlin: Trans World Meeting of populations and Intersex and new challenges. Presentations on the Trans and intersex Ecuador progress through Silueta X, November 2013.
- New York City, Los Angeles, Texas, Washington, Program Leaders GLBTI community State Department to strengthen advocates in Ecuador, January 2014.
- Stockholm and Uppsala, Program Leaders Rainbow for strengthening LGBTI populations, April to May 2014.

== Awards and honors ==
- Award Ecuador LGBTI Activist groups called "Pride and Diversity 2011" for her activist work with the population LGBTI with an emphasis on trans population, October 2011.
- Recognition for her contribution to the development and implementation of the "First scientific conference of the Psychology of the University of Guayaquil, October 2011.
- Recognition for participating as a speaker at the "First International Symposium on queer sexuality and gender from psychology", by the FLACSO, October 2012.
- Award by the group Women of Asphalt, which supports women activists in South America. One emphasizes her work on behalf of sexual diversity with greater emphasis on women and transgender people, December 2012.
- Recognition for Labour activist advocate for LGBTI Human Rights in Ecuador by Latino Equality Alliance United States, February 2014.

== See also ==
- Case No. 111-97-TC (1997), is a landmark decision by the Constitutional Tribunal of Ecuador on November 25, 1997, regarding the country's sodomy laws.
- 2008 Constitution of Ecuador (2008), The Constitution of Ecuador is the supreme law of Ecuador.
- Recognition of same-sex unions in Ecuador, (2009), Civil unions for same-sex couples were legalized by the approval of the 2008 Constitution of Ecuador.
- Silueta X (2008), is a nonprofit association whose mission is to fight for LGBT rights in Ecuador (people Transgender, Intersex, Lesbian, Gay and Bisexual), taking as its target population of transgender and transsexual female, male and intersex.
